

93001–93100 

|-bgcolor=#fefefe
| 93001 ||  || — || September 2, 2000 || Anderson Mesa || LONEOS || V || align=right | 1.5 km || 
|-id=002 bgcolor=#fefefe
| 93002 ||  || — || September 2, 2000 || Anderson Mesa || LONEOS || NYS || align=right | 1.0 km || 
|-id=003 bgcolor=#E9E9E9
| 93003 ||  || — || September 2, 2000 || Socorro || LINEAR || — || align=right | 4.5 km || 
|-id=004 bgcolor=#E9E9E9
| 93004 ||  || — || September 2, 2000 || Socorro || LINEAR || EUN || align=right | 4.0 km || 
|-id=005 bgcolor=#E9E9E9
| 93005 ||  || — || September 2, 2000 || Socorro || LINEAR || — || align=right | 2.2 km || 
|-id=006 bgcolor=#fefefe
| 93006 ||  || — || September 2, 2000 || Socorro || LINEAR || — || align=right | 1.6 km || 
|-id=007 bgcolor=#E9E9E9
| 93007 ||  || — || September 2, 2000 || Anderson Mesa || LONEOS || RAF || align=right | 3.0 km || 
|-id=008 bgcolor=#E9E9E9
| 93008 ||  || — || September 2, 2000 || Anderson Mesa || LONEOS || JUN || align=right | 3.0 km || 
|-id=009 bgcolor=#fefefe
| 93009 ||  || — || September 2, 2000 || Anderson Mesa || LONEOS || NYS || align=right | 2.3 km || 
|-id=010 bgcolor=#E9E9E9
| 93010 ||  || — || September 2, 2000 || Anderson Mesa || LONEOS || — || align=right | 2.1 km || 
|-id=011 bgcolor=#E9E9E9
| 93011 ||  || — || September 2, 2000 || Anderson Mesa || LONEOS || — || align=right | 1.6 km || 
|-id=012 bgcolor=#fefefe
| 93012 ||  || — || September 2, 2000 || Anderson Mesa || LONEOS || V || align=right | 1.9 km || 
|-id=013 bgcolor=#E9E9E9
| 93013 ||  || — || September 3, 2000 || Socorro || LINEAR || MAR || align=right | 2.3 km || 
|-id=014 bgcolor=#E9E9E9
| 93014 ||  || — || September 3, 2000 || Socorro || LINEAR || EUN || align=right | 2.4 km || 
|-id=015 bgcolor=#fefefe
| 93015 ||  || — || September 3, 2000 || Socorro || LINEAR || — || align=right | 1.8 km || 
|-id=016 bgcolor=#fefefe
| 93016 ||  || — || September 3, 2000 || Socorro || LINEAR || — || align=right | 1.9 km || 
|-id=017 bgcolor=#E9E9E9
| 93017 ||  || — || September 3, 2000 || Socorro || LINEAR || EUN || align=right | 2.6 km || 
|-id=018 bgcolor=#fefefe
| 93018 ||  || — || September 3, 2000 || Socorro || LINEAR || V || align=right | 1.7 km || 
|-id=019 bgcolor=#E9E9E9
| 93019 ||  || — || September 4, 2000 || Anderson Mesa || LONEOS || — || align=right | 2.2 km || 
|-id=020 bgcolor=#E9E9E9
| 93020 ||  || — || September 4, 2000 || Anderson Mesa || LONEOS || — || align=right | 3.7 km || 
|-id=021 bgcolor=#E9E9E9
| 93021 ||  || — || September 4, 2000 || Anderson Mesa || LONEOS || — || align=right | 2.9 km || 
|-id=022 bgcolor=#E9E9E9
| 93022 ||  || — || September 4, 2000 || Anderson Mesa || LONEOS || — || align=right | 1.7 km || 
|-id=023 bgcolor=#fefefe
| 93023 ||  || — || September 4, 2000 || Anderson Mesa || LONEOS || NYS || align=right | 4.8 km || 
|-id=024 bgcolor=#E9E9E9
| 93024 ||  || — || September 4, 2000 || Anderson Mesa || LONEOS || — || align=right | 3.0 km || 
|-id=025 bgcolor=#fefefe
| 93025 ||  || — || September 4, 2000 || Anderson Mesa || LONEOS || — || align=right | 1.7 km || 
|-id=026 bgcolor=#E9E9E9
| 93026 ||  || — || September 4, 2000 || Haleakala || NEAT || — || align=right | 3.4 km || 
|-id=027 bgcolor=#E9E9E9
| 93027 ||  || — || September 5, 2000 || Anderson Mesa || LONEOS || — || align=right | 2.0 km || 
|-id=028 bgcolor=#E9E9E9
| 93028 ||  || — || September 5, 2000 || Anderson Mesa || LONEOS || — || align=right | 6.7 km || 
|-id=029 bgcolor=#E9E9E9
| 93029 ||  || — || September 5, 2000 || Anderson Mesa || LONEOS || EUN || align=right | 2.5 km || 
|-id=030 bgcolor=#E9E9E9
| 93030 ||  || — || September 5, 2000 || Anderson Mesa || LONEOS || — || align=right | 3.1 km || 
|-id=031 bgcolor=#fefefe
| 93031 ||  || — || September 5, 2000 || Socorro || LINEAR || — || align=right | 4.0 km || 
|-id=032 bgcolor=#E9E9E9
| 93032 ||  || — || September 5, 2000 || Anderson Mesa || LONEOS || — || align=right | 3.5 km || 
|-id=033 bgcolor=#E9E9E9
| 93033 ||  || — || September 5, 2000 || Anderson Mesa || LONEOS || — || align=right | 2.2 km || 
|-id=034 bgcolor=#E9E9E9
| 93034 ||  || — || September 5, 2000 || Anderson Mesa || LONEOS || HNS || align=right | 3.0 km || 
|-id=035 bgcolor=#E9E9E9
| 93035 ||  || — || September 6, 2000 || Socorro || LINEAR || ADE || align=right | 2.9 km || 
|-id=036 bgcolor=#E9E9E9
| 93036 ||  || — || September 6, 2000 || Socorro || LINEAR || — || align=right | 3.6 km || 
|-id=037 bgcolor=#E9E9E9
| 93037 ||  || — || September 6, 2000 || Socorro || LINEAR || EUN || align=right | 3.2 km || 
|-id=038 bgcolor=#FA8072
| 93038 ||  || — || September 6, 2000 || Socorro || LINEAR || PHO || align=right | 3.1 km || 
|-id=039 bgcolor=#E9E9E9
| 93039 ||  || — || September 6, 2000 || Socorro || LINEAR || MAR || align=right | 2.3 km || 
|-id=040 bgcolor=#FA8072
| 93040 || 2000 SG || — || September 18, 2000 || Socorro || LINEAR || — || align=right | 3.8 km || 
|-id=041 bgcolor=#fefefe
| 93041 ||  || — || September 20, 2000 || Haleakala || NEAT || PHO || align=right | 2.6 km || 
|-id=042 bgcolor=#fefefe
| 93042 ||  || — || September 21, 2000 || Haleakala || NEAT || NYS || align=right | 1.9 km || 
|-id=043 bgcolor=#E9E9E9
| 93043 ||  || — || September 21, 2000 || Haleakala || NEAT || — || align=right | 3.2 km || 
|-id=044 bgcolor=#E9E9E9
| 93044 ||  || — || September 20, 2000 || Socorro || LINEAR || — || align=right | 2.2 km || 
|-id=045 bgcolor=#E9E9E9
| 93045 ||  || — || September 20, 2000 || Socorro || LINEAR || — || align=right | 2.9 km || 
|-id=046 bgcolor=#E9E9E9
| 93046 ||  || — || September 20, 2000 || Socorro || LINEAR || — || align=right | 2.6 km || 
|-id=047 bgcolor=#fefefe
| 93047 ||  || — || September 21, 2000 || Socorro || LINEAR || V || align=right | 1.7 km || 
|-id=048 bgcolor=#fefefe
| 93048 ||  || — || September 22, 2000 || Reedy Creek || R. H. McNaught || — || align=right | 2.6 km || 
|-id=049 bgcolor=#E9E9E9
| 93049 ||  || — || September 19, 2000 || Haleakala || NEAT || — || align=right | 2.1 km || 
|-id=050 bgcolor=#fefefe
| 93050 ||  || — || September 19, 2000 || Haleakala || NEAT || — || align=right | 1.6 km || 
|-id=051 bgcolor=#E9E9E9
| 93051 ||  || — || September 22, 2000 || Prescott || P. G. Comba || — || align=right | 2.0 km || 
|-id=052 bgcolor=#E9E9E9
| 93052 ||  || — || September 23, 2000 || Socorro || LINEAR || BAR || align=right | 3.9 km || 
|-id=053 bgcolor=#fefefe
| 93053 ||  || — || September 20, 2000 || Socorro || LINEAR || V || align=right | 2.0 km || 
|-id=054 bgcolor=#fefefe
| 93054 ||  || — || September 21, 2000 || Socorro || LINEAR || FLO || align=right | 1.6 km || 
|-id=055 bgcolor=#fefefe
| 93055 ||  || — || September 21, 2000 || Socorro || LINEAR || NYS || align=right | 1.6 km || 
|-id=056 bgcolor=#E9E9E9
| 93056 ||  || — || September 21, 2000 || Socorro || LINEAR || EUN || align=right | 2.0 km || 
|-id=057 bgcolor=#E9E9E9
| 93057 ||  || — || September 23, 2000 || Socorro || LINEAR || — || align=right | 2.8 km || 
|-id=058 bgcolor=#fefefe
| 93058 ||  || — || September 23, 2000 || Socorro || LINEAR || CHL || align=right | 4.3 km || 
|-id=059 bgcolor=#fefefe
| 93059 ||  || — || September 23, 2000 || Socorro || LINEAR || — || align=right | 2.9 km || 
|-id=060 bgcolor=#E9E9E9
| 93060 ||  || — || September 21, 2000 || Haleakala || NEAT || MAR || align=right | 2.1 km || 
|-id=061 bgcolor=#E9E9E9
| 93061 Barbagallo ||  ||  || September 23, 2000 || Bologna || San Vittore Obs. || — || align=right | 3.0 km || 
|-id=062 bgcolor=#fefefe
| 93062 ||  || — || September 19, 2000 || Haleakala || NEAT || — || align=right | 1.8 km || 
|-id=063 bgcolor=#fefefe
| 93063 ||  || — || September 20, 2000 || Haleakala || NEAT || — || align=right | 1.7 km || 
|-id=064 bgcolor=#E9E9E9
| 93064 ||  || — || September 20, 2000 || Haleakala || NEAT || — || align=right | 1.9 km || 
|-id=065 bgcolor=#fefefe
| 93065 ||  || — || September 20, 2000 || Haleakala || NEAT || V || align=right | 2.1 km || 
|-id=066 bgcolor=#E9E9E9
| 93066 ||  || — || September 20, 2000 || Haleakala || NEAT || — || align=right | 2.9 km || 
|-id=067 bgcolor=#fefefe
| 93067 ||  || — || September 25, 2000 || Višnjan Observatory || K. Korlević || MAS || align=right | 2.1 km || 
|-id=068 bgcolor=#E9E9E9
| 93068 ||  || — || September 26, 2000 || Bisei SG Center || BATTeRS || — || align=right | 7.5 km || 
|-id=069 bgcolor=#E9E9E9
| 93069 ||  || — || September 26, 2000 || Bisei SG Center || BATTeRS || — || align=right | 2.2 km || 
|-id=070 bgcolor=#fefefe
| 93070 ||  || — || September 22, 2000 || Socorro || LINEAR || — || align=right | 4.2 km || 
|-id=071 bgcolor=#E9E9E9
| 93071 ||  || — || September 23, 2000 || Socorro || LINEAR || — || align=right | 2.8 km || 
|-id=072 bgcolor=#fefefe
| 93072 ||  || — || September 23, 2000 || Socorro || LINEAR || V || align=right | 1.8 km || 
|-id=073 bgcolor=#E9E9E9
| 93073 ||  || — || September 23, 2000 || Socorro || LINEAR || — || align=right | 2.2 km || 
|-id=074 bgcolor=#fefefe
| 93074 ||  || — || September 23, 2000 || Socorro || LINEAR || V || align=right | 1.4 km || 
|-id=075 bgcolor=#E9E9E9
| 93075 ||  || — || September 23, 2000 || Socorro || LINEAR || POS || align=right | 7.2 km || 
|-id=076 bgcolor=#E9E9E9
| 93076 ||  || — || September 23, 2000 || Socorro || LINEAR || — || align=right | 2.4 km || 
|-id=077 bgcolor=#E9E9E9
| 93077 ||  || — || September 23, 2000 || Socorro || LINEAR || ADE || align=right | 5.1 km || 
|-id=078 bgcolor=#fefefe
| 93078 ||  || — || September 23, 2000 || Socorro || LINEAR || — || align=right | 3.0 km || 
|-id=079 bgcolor=#E9E9E9
| 93079 ||  || — || September 23, 2000 || Socorro || LINEAR || — || align=right | 3.0 km || 
|-id=080 bgcolor=#E9E9E9
| 93080 ||  || — || September 24, 2000 || Socorro || LINEAR || — || align=right | 2.0 km || 
|-id=081 bgcolor=#fefefe
| 93081 ||  || — || September 24, 2000 || Socorro || LINEAR || — || align=right | 2.1 km || 
|-id=082 bgcolor=#fefefe
| 93082 ||  || — || September 24, 2000 || Socorro || LINEAR || — || align=right | 1.8 km || 
|-id=083 bgcolor=#E9E9E9
| 93083 ||  || — || September 24, 2000 || Socorro || LINEAR || — || align=right | 1.9 km || 
|-id=084 bgcolor=#E9E9E9
| 93084 ||  || — || September 24, 2000 || Socorro || LINEAR || — || align=right | 4.8 km || 
|-id=085 bgcolor=#E9E9E9
| 93085 ||  || — || September 24, 2000 || Socorro || LINEAR || — || align=right | 2.1 km || 
|-id=086 bgcolor=#E9E9E9
| 93086 ||  || — || September 24, 2000 || Socorro || LINEAR || — || align=right | 2.2 km || 
|-id=087 bgcolor=#E9E9E9
| 93087 ||  || — || September 24, 2000 || Socorro || LINEAR || — || align=right | 4.5 km || 
|-id=088 bgcolor=#fefefe
| 93088 ||  || — || September 24, 2000 || Socorro || LINEAR || — || align=right | 2.7 km || 
|-id=089 bgcolor=#fefefe
| 93089 ||  || — || September 24, 2000 || Socorro || LINEAR || — || align=right | 1.6 km || 
|-id=090 bgcolor=#E9E9E9
| 93090 ||  || — || September 24, 2000 || Socorro || LINEAR || — || align=right | 1.8 km || 
|-id=091 bgcolor=#fefefe
| 93091 ||  || — || September 24, 2000 || Socorro || LINEAR || — || align=right | 1.9 km || 
|-id=092 bgcolor=#fefefe
| 93092 ||  || — || September 24, 2000 || Socorro || LINEAR || NYS || align=right | 1.2 km || 
|-id=093 bgcolor=#E9E9E9
| 93093 ||  || — || September 24, 2000 || Socorro || LINEAR || — || align=right | 3.6 km || 
|-id=094 bgcolor=#fefefe
| 93094 ||  || — || September 24, 2000 || Socorro || LINEAR || V || align=right | 2.9 km || 
|-id=095 bgcolor=#E9E9E9
| 93095 ||  || — || September 24, 2000 || Socorro || LINEAR || — || align=right | 2.3 km || 
|-id=096 bgcolor=#E9E9E9
| 93096 ||  || — || September 24, 2000 || Socorro || LINEAR || — || align=right | 2.7 km || 
|-id=097 bgcolor=#E9E9E9
| 93097 ||  || — || September 24, 2000 || Socorro || LINEAR || — || align=right | 2.9 km || 
|-id=098 bgcolor=#E9E9E9
| 93098 ||  || — || September 24, 2000 || Socorro || LINEAR || — || align=right | 1.9 km || 
|-id=099 bgcolor=#E9E9E9
| 93099 ||  || — || September 24, 2000 || Socorro || LINEAR || — || align=right | 2.0 km || 
|-id=100 bgcolor=#E9E9E9
| 93100 ||  || — || September 24, 2000 || Socorro || LINEAR || — || align=right | 3.2 km || 
|}

93101–93200 

|-bgcolor=#fefefe
| 93101 ||  || — || September 26, 2000 || Bisei SG Center || BATTeRS || — || align=right | 3.9 km || 
|-id=102 bgcolor=#fefefe
| 93102 Leroy ||  ||  || September 27, 2000 || Sainte-Clotilde || R. Chassagne, C. Demeautis || V || align=right | 2.0 km || 
|-id=103 bgcolor=#E9E9E9
| 93103 ||  || — || September 23, 2000 || Socorro || LINEAR || HNS || align=right | 2.2 km || 
|-id=104 bgcolor=#E9E9E9
| 93104 ||  || — || September 22, 2000 || Socorro || LINEAR || — || align=right | 3.2 km || 
|-id=105 bgcolor=#E9E9E9
| 93105 ||  || — || September 23, 2000 || Socorro || LINEAR || — || align=right | 2.2 km || 
|-id=106 bgcolor=#E9E9E9
| 93106 ||  || — || September 23, 2000 || Socorro || LINEAR || — || align=right | 5.7 km || 
|-id=107 bgcolor=#fefefe
| 93107 ||  || — || September 23, 2000 || Socorro || LINEAR || — || align=right | 1.9 km || 
|-id=108 bgcolor=#E9E9E9
| 93108 ||  || — || September 23, 2000 || Socorro || LINEAR || — || align=right | 2.1 km || 
|-id=109 bgcolor=#E9E9E9
| 93109 ||  || — || September 23, 2000 || Socorro || LINEAR || HNS || align=right | 3.5 km || 
|-id=110 bgcolor=#E9E9E9
| 93110 ||  || — || September 24, 2000 || Socorro || LINEAR || — || align=right | 1.6 km || 
|-id=111 bgcolor=#E9E9E9
| 93111 ||  || — || September 24, 2000 || Socorro || LINEAR || — || align=right | 3.3 km || 
|-id=112 bgcolor=#E9E9E9
| 93112 ||  || — || September 24, 2000 || Socorro || LINEAR || — || align=right | 2.8 km || 
|-id=113 bgcolor=#E9E9E9
| 93113 ||  || — || September 24, 2000 || Socorro || LINEAR || HEN || align=right | 2.1 km || 
|-id=114 bgcolor=#E9E9E9
| 93114 ||  || — || September 24, 2000 || Socorro || LINEAR || — || align=right | 2.1 km || 
|-id=115 bgcolor=#fefefe
| 93115 ||  || — || September 24, 2000 || Socorro || LINEAR || — || align=right | 1.8 km || 
|-id=116 bgcolor=#fefefe
| 93116 ||  || — || September 24, 2000 || Socorro || LINEAR || — || align=right | 4.3 km || 
|-id=117 bgcolor=#E9E9E9
| 93117 ||  || — || September 24, 2000 || Socorro || LINEAR || — || align=right | 2.1 km || 
|-id=118 bgcolor=#fefefe
| 93118 ||  || — || September 24, 2000 || Socorro || LINEAR || NYS || align=right | 2.0 km || 
|-id=119 bgcolor=#E9E9E9
| 93119 ||  || — || September 24, 2000 || Socorro || LINEAR || — || align=right | 1.9 km || 
|-id=120 bgcolor=#E9E9E9
| 93120 ||  || — || September 24, 2000 || Socorro || LINEAR || ADE || align=right | 4.1 km || 
|-id=121 bgcolor=#E9E9E9
| 93121 ||  || — || September 24, 2000 || Socorro || LINEAR || — || align=right | 4.0 km || 
|-id=122 bgcolor=#E9E9E9
| 93122 ||  || — || September 24, 2000 || Socorro || LINEAR || — || align=right | 2.8 km || 
|-id=123 bgcolor=#fefefe
| 93123 ||  || — || September 24, 2000 || Socorro || LINEAR || — || align=right | 2.3 km || 
|-id=124 bgcolor=#fefefe
| 93124 ||  || — || September 24, 2000 || Socorro || LINEAR || MAS || align=right | 2.3 km || 
|-id=125 bgcolor=#fefefe
| 93125 ||  || — || September 24, 2000 || Socorro || LINEAR || V || align=right | 1.5 km || 
|-id=126 bgcolor=#E9E9E9
| 93126 ||  || — || September 24, 2000 || Socorro || LINEAR || — || align=right | 2.0 km || 
|-id=127 bgcolor=#E9E9E9
| 93127 ||  || — || September 24, 2000 || Socorro || LINEAR || — || align=right | 1.3 km || 
|-id=128 bgcolor=#E9E9E9
| 93128 ||  || — || September 24, 2000 || Socorro || LINEAR || — || align=right | 2.0 km || 
|-id=129 bgcolor=#fefefe
| 93129 ||  || — || September 24, 2000 || Socorro || LINEAR || NYS || align=right | 3.0 km || 
|-id=130 bgcolor=#E9E9E9
| 93130 ||  || — || September 24, 2000 || Socorro || LINEAR || — || align=right | 2.3 km || 
|-id=131 bgcolor=#E9E9E9
| 93131 ||  || — || September 24, 2000 || Socorro || LINEAR || — || align=right | 2.0 km || 
|-id=132 bgcolor=#fefefe
| 93132 ||  || — || September 24, 2000 || Socorro || LINEAR || V || align=right | 1.6 km || 
|-id=133 bgcolor=#fefefe
| 93133 ||  || — || September 24, 2000 || Socorro || LINEAR || — || align=right | 2.3 km || 
|-id=134 bgcolor=#E9E9E9
| 93134 ||  || — || September 24, 2000 || Socorro || LINEAR || — || align=right | 2.7 km || 
|-id=135 bgcolor=#E9E9E9
| 93135 ||  || — || September 24, 2000 || Socorro || LINEAR || — || align=right | 2.7 km || 
|-id=136 bgcolor=#E9E9E9
| 93136 ||  || — || September 24, 2000 || Socorro || LINEAR || — || align=right | 2.0 km || 
|-id=137 bgcolor=#E9E9E9
| 93137 ||  || — || September 24, 2000 || Socorro || LINEAR || — || align=right | 4.2 km || 
|-id=138 bgcolor=#E9E9E9
| 93138 ||  || — || September 24, 2000 || Socorro || LINEAR || MAR || align=right | 2.2 km || 
|-id=139 bgcolor=#E9E9E9
| 93139 ||  || — || September 24, 2000 || Socorro || LINEAR || EUN || align=right | 2.5 km || 
|-id=140 bgcolor=#E9E9E9
| 93140 ||  || — || September 24, 2000 || Socorro || LINEAR || — || align=right | 2.1 km || 
|-id=141 bgcolor=#E9E9E9
| 93141 ||  || — || September 24, 2000 || Socorro || LINEAR || — || align=right | 1.8 km || 
|-id=142 bgcolor=#fefefe
| 93142 ||  || — || September 24, 2000 || Socorro || LINEAR || — || align=right | 1.8 km || 
|-id=143 bgcolor=#E9E9E9
| 93143 ||  || — || September 24, 2000 || Socorro || LINEAR || — || align=right | 1.8 km || 
|-id=144 bgcolor=#E9E9E9
| 93144 ||  || — || September 24, 2000 || Socorro || LINEAR || — || align=right | 2.8 km || 
|-id=145 bgcolor=#E9E9E9
| 93145 ||  || — || September 24, 2000 || Socorro || LINEAR || — || align=right | 1.6 km || 
|-id=146 bgcolor=#E9E9E9
| 93146 ||  || — || September 24, 2000 || Socorro || LINEAR || — || align=right | 1.9 km || 
|-id=147 bgcolor=#E9E9E9
| 93147 ||  || — || September 24, 2000 || Socorro || LINEAR || — || align=right | 4.6 km || 
|-id=148 bgcolor=#E9E9E9
| 93148 ||  || — || September 24, 2000 || Socorro || LINEAR || — || align=right | 2.8 km || 
|-id=149 bgcolor=#E9E9E9
| 93149 ||  || — || September 24, 2000 || Socorro || LINEAR || — || align=right | 1.5 km || 
|-id=150 bgcolor=#E9E9E9
| 93150 ||  || — || September 24, 2000 || Socorro || LINEAR || — || align=right | 2.5 km || 
|-id=151 bgcolor=#E9E9E9
| 93151 ||  || — || September 24, 2000 || Socorro || LINEAR || — || align=right | 2.2 km || 
|-id=152 bgcolor=#E9E9E9
| 93152 ||  || — || September 24, 2000 || Socorro || LINEAR || — || align=right | 2.8 km || 
|-id=153 bgcolor=#E9E9E9
| 93153 ||  || — || September 24, 2000 || Socorro || LINEAR || — || align=right | 2.6 km || 
|-id=154 bgcolor=#E9E9E9
| 93154 ||  || — || September 24, 2000 || Socorro || LINEAR || — || align=right | 4.5 km || 
|-id=155 bgcolor=#E9E9E9
| 93155 ||  || — || September 24, 2000 || Socorro || LINEAR || — || align=right | 2.0 km || 
|-id=156 bgcolor=#fefefe
| 93156 ||  || — || September 24, 2000 || Socorro || LINEAR || — || align=right | 6.0 km || 
|-id=157 bgcolor=#E9E9E9
| 93157 ||  || — || September 24, 2000 || Socorro || LINEAR || — || align=right | 3.8 km || 
|-id=158 bgcolor=#fefefe
| 93158 ||  || — || September 24, 2000 || Socorro || LINEAR || — || align=right | 2.9 km || 
|-id=159 bgcolor=#fefefe
| 93159 ||  || — || September 24, 2000 || Socorro || LINEAR || — || align=right | 2.6 km || 
|-id=160 bgcolor=#E9E9E9
| 93160 ||  || — || September 24, 2000 || Socorro || LINEAR || — || align=right | 1.5 km || 
|-id=161 bgcolor=#E9E9E9
| 93161 ||  || — || September 24, 2000 || Socorro || LINEAR || — || align=right | 2.8 km || 
|-id=162 bgcolor=#E9E9E9
| 93162 ||  || — || September 24, 2000 || Socorro || LINEAR || EUN || align=right | 3.7 km || 
|-id=163 bgcolor=#E9E9E9
| 93163 ||  || — || September 25, 2000 || Socorro || LINEAR || MAR || align=right | 2.5 km || 
|-id=164 bgcolor=#E9E9E9
| 93164 Gordontelepun ||  ||  || September 29, 2000 || Emerald Lane || L. Ball || — || align=right | 2.1 km || 
|-id=165 bgcolor=#E9E9E9
| 93165 ||  || — || September 23, 2000 || Socorro || LINEAR || — || align=right | 4.1 km || 
|-id=166 bgcolor=#fefefe
| 93166 ||  || — || September 23, 2000 || Socorro || LINEAR || — || align=right | 4.7 km || 
|-id=167 bgcolor=#fefefe
| 93167 ||  || — || September 23, 2000 || Socorro || LINEAR || V || align=right | 2.1 km || 
|-id=168 bgcolor=#fefefe
| 93168 ||  || — || September 23, 2000 || Socorro || LINEAR || — || align=right | 1.9 km || 
|-id=169 bgcolor=#E9E9E9
| 93169 ||  || — || September 23, 2000 || Socorro || LINEAR || — || align=right | 4.2 km || 
|-id=170 bgcolor=#fefefe
| 93170 ||  || — || September 23, 2000 || Socorro || LINEAR || FLO || align=right | 2.8 km || 
|-id=171 bgcolor=#E9E9E9
| 93171 ||  || — || September 23, 2000 || Socorro || LINEAR || — || align=right | 2.1 km || 
|-id=172 bgcolor=#E9E9E9
| 93172 ||  || — || September 23, 2000 || Socorro || LINEAR || — || align=right | 2.7 km || 
|-id=173 bgcolor=#fefefe
| 93173 ||  || — || September 24, 2000 || Socorro || LINEAR || — || align=right | 3.3 km || 
|-id=174 bgcolor=#E9E9E9
| 93174 ||  || — || September 24, 2000 || Socorro || LINEAR || MAR || align=right | 3.3 km || 
|-id=175 bgcolor=#E9E9E9
| 93175 ||  || — || September 24, 2000 || Socorro || LINEAR || — || align=right | 1.9 km || 
|-id=176 bgcolor=#fefefe
| 93176 ||  || — || September 24, 2000 || Socorro || LINEAR || — || align=right | 2.0 km || 
|-id=177 bgcolor=#fefefe
| 93177 ||  || — || September 24, 2000 || Socorro || LINEAR || — || align=right | 2.1 km || 
|-id=178 bgcolor=#fefefe
| 93178 ||  || — || September 24, 2000 || Socorro || LINEAR || V || align=right | 1.8 km || 
|-id=179 bgcolor=#E9E9E9
| 93179 ||  || — || September 24, 2000 || Socorro || LINEAR || — || align=right | 3.2 km || 
|-id=180 bgcolor=#E9E9E9
| 93180 ||  || — || September 24, 2000 || Socorro || LINEAR || — || align=right | 3.5 km || 
|-id=181 bgcolor=#E9E9E9
| 93181 ||  || — || September 24, 2000 || Socorro || LINEAR || EUN || align=right | 2.0 km || 
|-id=182 bgcolor=#E9E9E9
| 93182 ||  || — || September 24, 2000 || Socorro || LINEAR || — || align=right | 3.1 km || 
|-id=183 bgcolor=#E9E9E9
| 93183 ||  || — || September 24, 2000 || Socorro || LINEAR || — || align=right | 2.7 km || 
|-id=184 bgcolor=#E9E9E9
| 93184 ||  || — || September 24, 2000 || Socorro || LINEAR || — || align=right | 1.4 km || 
|-id=185 bgcolor=#E9E9E9
| 93185 ||  || — || September 24, 2000 || Socorro || LINEAR || — || align=right | 3.2 km || 
|-id=186 bgcolor=#E9E9E9
| 93186 ||  || — || September 24, 2000 || Socorro || LINEAR || — || align=right | 2.4 km || 
|-id=187 bgcolor=#E9E9E9
| 93187 ||  || — || September 24, 2000 || Socorro || LINEAR || — || align=right | 5.5 km || 
|-id=188 bgcolor=#E9E9E9
| 93188 ||  || — || September 24, 2000 || Socorro || LINEAR || — || align=right | 1.6 km || 
|-id=189 bgcolor=#E9E9E9
| 93189 ||  || — || September 24, 2000 || Socorro || LINEAR || — || align=right | 3.8 km || 
|-id=190 bgcolor=#E9E9E9
| 93190 ||  || — || September 24, 2000 || Socorro || LINEAR || — || align=right | 2.4 km || 
|-id=191 bgcolor=#fefefe
| 93191 ||  || — || September 24, 2000 || Socorro || LINEAR || MAS || align=right | 2.9 km || 
|-id=192 bgcolor=#E9E9E9
| 93192 ||  || — || September 24, 2000 || Socorro || LINEAR || — || align=right | 1.7 km || 
|-id=193 bgcolor=#E9E9E9
| 93193 ||  || — || September 24, 2000 || Socorro || LINEAR || — || align=right | 3.7 km || 
|-id=194 bgcolor=#fefefe
| 93194 ||  || — || September 24, 2000 || Socorro || LINEAR || NYS || align=right | 2.3 km || 
|-id=195 bgcolor=#E9E9E9
| 93195 ||  || — || September 24, 2000 || Socorro || LINEAR || fast? || align=right | 2.8 km || 
|-id=196 bgcolor=#fefefe
| 93196 ||  || — || September 24, 2000 || Socorro || LINEAR || MAS || align=right | 1.7 km || 
|-id=197 bgcolor=#E9E9E9
| 93197 ||  || — || September 24, 2000 || Socorro || LINEAR || MAR || align=right | 2.8 km || 
|-id=198 bgcolor=#E9E9E9
| 93198 ||  || — || September 24, 2000 || Socorro || LINEAR || — || align=right | 3.0 km || 
|-id=199 bgcolor=#E9E9E9
| 93199 ||  || — || September 24, 2000 || Socorro || LINEAR || — || align=right | 3.9 km || 
|-id=200 bgcolor=#E9E9E9
| 93200 ||  || — || September 24, 2000 || Socorro || LINEAR || — || align=right | 2.3 km || 
|}

93201–93300 

|-bgcolor=#E9E9E9
| 93201 ||  || — || September 24, 2000 || Socorro || LINEAR || — || align=right | 3.8 km || 
|-id=202 bgcolor=#E9E9E9
| 93202 ||  || — || September 24, 2000 || Socorro || LINEAR || — || align=right | 2.2 km || 
|-id=203 bgcolor=#E9E9E9
| 93203 ||  || — || September 24, 2000 || Socorro || LINEAR || — || align=right | 2.9 km || 
|-id=204 bgcolor=#E9E9E9
| 93204 ||  || — || September 24, 2000 || Socorro || LINEAR || — || align=right | 2.0 km || 
|-id=205 bgcolor=#E9E9E9
| 93205 ||  || — || September 24, 2000 || Socorro || LINEAR || — || align=right | 1.8 km || 
|-id=206 bgcolor=#E9E9E9
| 93206 ||  || — || September 24, 2000 || Socorro || LINEAR || — || align=right | 2.6 km || 
|-id=207 bgcolor=#E9E9E9
| 93207 ||  || — || September 24, 2000 || Socorro || LINEAR || — || align=right | 3.0 km || 
|-id=208 bgcolor=#E9E9E9
| 93208 ||  || — || September 24, 2000 || Socorro || LINEAR || — || align=right | 2.6 km || 
|-id=209 bgcolor=#fefefe
| 93209 ||  || — || September 24, 2000 || Socorro || LINEAR || V || align=right | 1.6 km || 
|-id=210 bgcolor=#E9E9E9
| 93210 ||  || — || September 24, 2000 || Socorro || LINEAR || WIT || align=right | 1.9 km || 
|-id=211 bgcolor=#E9E9E9
| 93211 ||  || — || September 24, 2000 || Socorro || LINEAR || WIT || align=right | 1.9 km || 
|-id=212 bgcolor=#E9E9E9
| 93212 ||  || — || September 24, 2000 || Socorro || LINEAR || — || align=right | 2.4 km || 
|-id=213 bgcolor=#d6d6d6
| 93213 ||  || — || September 24, 2000 || Socorro || LINEAR || — || align=right | 11 km || 
|-id=214 bgcolor=#fefefe
| 93214 ||  || — || September 24, 2000 || Socorro || LINEAR || — || align=right | 2.6 km || 
|-id=215 bgcolor=#E9E9E9
| 93215 ||  || — || September 24, 2000 || Socorro || LINEAR || — || align=right | 3.2 km || 
|-id=216 bgcolor=#E9E9E9
| 93216 ||  || — || September 24, 2000 || Socorro || LINEAR || — || align=right | 3.3 km || 
|-id=217 bgcolor=#E9E9E9
| 93217 ||  || — || September 22, 2000 || Socorro || LINEAR || — || align=right | 2.4 km || 
|-id=218 bgcolor=#E9E9E9
| 93218 ||  || — || September 22, 2000 || Socorro || LINEAR || EUN || align=right | 2.2 km || 
|-id=219 bgcolor=#E9E9E9
| 93219 ||  || — || September 23, 2000 || Socorro || LINEAR || — || align=right | 2.3 km || 
|-id=220 bgcolor=#E9E9E9
| 93220 ||  || — || September 23, 2000 || Socorro || LINEAR || EUN || align=right | 2.4 km || 
|-id=221 bgcolor=#E9E9E9
| 93221 ||  || — || September 23, 2000 || Socorro || LINEAR || — || align=right | 9.0 km || 
|-id=222 bgcolor=#E9E9E9
| 93222 ||  || — || September 23, 2000 || Socorro || LINEAR || — || align=right | 2.8 km || 
|-id=223 bgcolor=#E9E9E9
| 93223 ||  || — || September 23, 2000 || Socorro || LINEAR || — || align=right | 5.8 km || 
|-id=224 bgcolor=#fefefe
| 93224 ||  || — || September 23, 2000 || Socorro || LINEAR || V || align=right | 1.3 km || 
|-id=225 bgcolor=#E9E9E9
| 93225 ||  || — || September 23, 2000 || Socorro || LINEAR || ADE || align=right | 6.7 km || 
|-id=226 bgcolor=#E9E9E9
| 93226 ||  || — || September 23, 2000 || Socorro || LINEAR || — || align=right | 2.4 km || 
|-id=227 bgcolor=#E9E9E9
| 93227 ||  || — || September 23, 2000 || Socorro || LINEAR || EUN || align=right | 4.1 km || 
|-id=228 bgcolor=#E9E9E9
| 93228 ||  || — || September 24, 2000 || Socorro || LINEAR || — || align=right | 2.4 km || 
|-id=229 bgcolor=#E9E9E9
| 93229 ||  || — || September 24, 2000 || Socorro || LINEAR || — || align=right | 2.1 km || 
|-id=230 bgcolor=#E9E9E9
| 93230 ||  || — || September 24, 2000 || Socorro || LINEAR || — || align=right | 2.9 km || 
|-id=231 bgcolor=#E9E9E9
| 93231 ||  || — || September 24, 2000 || Socorro || LINEAR || — || align=right | 1.9 km || 
|-id=232 bgcolor=#E9E9E9
| 93232 ||  || — || September 24, 2000 || Socorro || LINEAR || — || align=right | 4.8 km || 
|-id=233 bgcolor=#E9E9E9
| 93233 ||  || — || September 24, 2000 || Socorro || LINEAR || HEN || align=right | 2.4 km || 
|-id=234 bgcolor=#E9E9E9
| 93234 ||  || — || September 24, 2000 || Socorro || LINEAR || — || align=right | 1.8 km || 
|-id=235 bgcolor=#fefefe
| 93235 ||  || — || September 24, 2000 || Socorro || LINEAR || — || align=right | 2.3 km || 
|-id=236 bgcolor=#E9E9E9
| 93236 ||  || — || September 24, 2000 || Socorro || LINEAR || — || align=right | 4.9 km || 
|-id=237 bgcolor=#fefefe
| 93237 ||  || — || September 24, 2000 || Socorro || LINEAR || NYS || align=right | 2.1 km || 
|-id=238 bgcolor=#fefefe
| 93238 ||  || — || September 24, 2000 || Socorro || LINEAR || NYS || align=right | 1.8 km || 
|-id=239 bgcolor=#E9E9E9
| 93239 ||  || — || September 24, 2000 || Socorro || LINEAR || — || align=right | 7.3 km || 
|-id=240 bgcolor=#E9E9E9
| 93240 ||  || — || September 24, 2000 || Socorro || LINEAR || — || align=right | 2.8 km || 
|-id=241 bgcolor=#E9E9E9
| 93241 ||  || — || September 24, 2000 || Socorro || LINEAR || — || align=right | 3.2 km || 
|-id=242 bgcolor=#E9E9E9
| 93242 ||  || — || September 24, 2000 || Socorro || LINEAR || — || align=right | 3.9 km || 
|-id=243 bgcolor=#E9E9E9
| 93243 ||  || — || September 24, 2000 || Socorro || LINEAR || — || align=right | 2.3 km || 
|-id=244 bgcolor=#E9E9E9
| 93244 ||  || — || September 24, 2000 || Socorro || LINEAR || — || align=right | 3.0 km || 
|-id=245 bgcolor=#E9E9E9
| 93245 ||  || — || September 24, 2000 || Socorro || LINEAR || EUN || align=right | 5.1 km || 
|-id=246 bgcolor=#E9E9E9
| 93246 ||  || — || September 24, 2000 || Socorro || LINEAR || — || align=right | 4.3 km || 
|-id=247 bgcolor=#E9E9E9
| 93247 ||  || — || September 24, 2000 || Socorro || LINEAR || HNS || align=right | 2.9 km || 
|-id=248 bgcolor=#E9E9E9
| 93248 ||  || — || September 26, 2000 || Socorro || LINEAR || EUN || align=right | 2.8 km || 
|-id=249 bgcolor=#E9E9E9
| 93249 ||  || — || September 27, 2000 || Socorro || LINEAR || — || align=right | 3.5 km || 
|-id=250 bgcolor=#fefefe
| 93250 ||  || — || September 27, 2000 || Socorro || LINEAR || — || align=right | 2.2 km || 
|-id=251 bgcolor=#E9E9E9
| 93251 ||  || — || September 27, 2000 || Socorro || LINEAR || — || align=right | 2.5 km || 
|-id=252 bgcolor=#E9E9E9
| 93252 ||  || — || September 27, 2000 || Socorro || LINEAR || — || align=right | 4.4 km || 
|-id=253 bgcolor=#E9E9E9
| 93253 ||  || — || September 27, 2000 || Socorro || LINEAR || — || align=right | 4.0 km || 
|-id=254 bgcolor=#d6d6d6
| 93254 ||  || — || September 27, 2000 || Socorro || LINEAR || — || align=right | 7.3 km || 
|-id=255 bgcolor=#E9E9E9
| 93255 ||  || — || September 29, 2000 || Ondřejov || P. Kušnirák, P. Pravec || — || align=right | 2.0 km || 
|-id=256 bgcolor=#E9E9E9
| 93256 Stach ||  ||  || September 29, 2000 || Ondřejov || P. Pravec, P. Kušnirák || — || align=right | 4.8 km || 
|-id=257 bgcolor=#E9E9E9
| 93257 ||  || — || September 23, 2000 || Socorro || LINEAR || — || align=right | 3.2 km || 
|-id=258 bgcolor=#E9E9E9
| 93258 ||  || — || September 23, 2000 || Socorro || LINEAR || — || align=right | 3.8 km || 
|-id=259 bgcolor=#E9E9E9
| 93259 ||  || — || September 23, 2000 || Socorro || LINEAR || — || align=right | 2.0 km || 
|-id=260 bgcolor=#E9E9E9
| 93260 ||  || — || September 23, 2000 || Socorro || LINEAR || — || align=right | 4.9 km || 
|-id=261 bgcolor=#fefefe
| 93261 ||  || — || September 23, 2000 || Socorro || LINEAR || V || align=right | 1.7 km || 
|-id=262 bgcolor=#E9E9E9
| 93262 ||  || — || September 23, 2000 || Socorro || LINEAR || MIT || align=right | 8.4 km || 
|-id=263 bgcolor=#E9E9E9
| 93263 ||  || — || September 24, 2000 || Socorro || LINEAR || — || align=right | 6.2 km || 
|-id=264 bgcolor=#E9E9E9
| 93264 ||  || — || September 25, 2000 || Socorro || LINEAR || GEF || align=right | 2.6 km || 
|-id=265 bgcolor=#E9E9E9
| 93265 ||  || — || September 26, 2000 || Socorro || LINEAR || — || align=right | 6.2 km || 
|-id=266 bgcolor=#E9E9E9
| 93266 ||  || — || September 26, 2000 || Socorro || LINEAR || — || align=right | 4.2 km || 
|-id=267 bgcolor=#E9E9E9
| 93267 ||  || — || September 28, 2000 || Socorro || LINEAR || EUN || align=right | 2.7 km || 
|-id=268 bgcolor=#E9E9E9
| 93268 ||  || — || September 28, 2000 || Socorro || LINEAR || ADE || align=right | 4.4 km || 
|-id=269 bgcolor=#E9E9E9
| 93269 ||  || — || September 28, 2000 || Socorro || LINEAR || — || align=right | 5.7 km || 
|-id=270 bgcolor=#E9E9E9
| 93270 ||  || — || September 28, 2000 || Socorro || LINEAR || GEF || align=right | 3.2 km || 
|-id=271 bgcolor=#E9E9E9
| 93271 ||  || — || September 28, 2000 || Socorro || LINEAR || — || align=right | 3.6 km || 
|-id=272 bgcolor=#E9E9E9
| 93272 ||  || — || September 28, 2000 || Socorro || LINEAR || — || align=right | 2.9 km || 
|-id=273 bgcolor=#E9E9E9
| 93273 ||  || — || September 28, 2000 || Socorro || LINEAR || — || align=right | 3.2 km || 
|-id=274 bgcolor=#E9E9E9
| 93274 ||  || — || September 28, 2000 || Socorro || LINEAR || — || align=right | 3.2 km || 
|-id=275 bgcolor=#E9E9E9
| 93275 ||  || — || September 28, 2000 || Socorro || LINEAR || — || align=right | 2.1 km || 
|-id=276 bgcolor=#E9E9E9
| 93276 ||  || — || September 28, 2000 || Socorro || LINEAR || WIT || align=right | 2.4 km || 
|-id=277 bgcolor=#E9E9E9
| 93277 ||  || — || September 28, 2000 || Socorro || LINEAR || EUN || align=right | 3.0 km || 
|-id=278 bgcolor=#fefefe
| 93278 ||  || — || September 19, 2000 || Haleakala || NEAT || — || align=right | 4.0 km || 
|-id=279 bgcolor=#fefefe
| 93279 ||  || — || September 19, 2000 || Haleakala || NEAT || — || align=right | 2.8 km || 
|-id=280 bgcolor=#fefefe
| 93280 ||  || — || September 21, 2000 || Haleakala || NEAT || — || align=right | 4.7 km || 
|-id=281 bgcolor=#E9E9E9
| 93281 ||  || — || September 21, 2000 || Haleakala || NEAT || — || align=right | 1.5 km || 
|-id=282 bgcolor=#E9E9E9
| 93282 ||  || — || September 21, 2000 || Haleakala || NEAT || — || align=right | 2.0 km || 
|-id=283 bgcolor=#E9E9E9
| 93283 ||  || — || September 21, 2000 || Haleakala || NEAT || EUN || align=right | 3.2 km || 
|-id=284 bgcolor=#E9E9E9
| 93284 ||  || — || September 22, 2000 || Kitt Peak || Spacewatch || — || align=right | 1.7 km || 
|-id=285 bgcolor=#fefefe
| 93285 ||  || — || September 22, 2000 || Haleakala || NEAT || — || align=right | 5.4 km || 
|-id=286 bgcolor=#E9E9E9
| 93286 ||  || — || September 24, 2000 || Socorro || LINEAR || — || align=right | 4.8 km || 
|-id=287 bgcolor=#E9E9E9
| 93287 ||  || — || September 24, 2000 || Socorro || LINEAR || — || align=right | 1.6 km || 
|-id=288 bgcolor=#E9E9E9
| 93288 ||  || — || September 24, 2000 || Socorro || LINEAR || HNS || align=right | 3.0 km || 
|-id=289 bgcolor=#E9E9E9
| 93289 ||  || — || September 24, 2000 || Socorro || LINEAR || EUN || align=right | 2.3 km || 
|-id=290 bgcolor=#E9E9E9
| 93290 ||  || — || September 24, 2000 || Socorro || LINEAR || — || align=right | 3.2 km || 
|-id=291 bgcolor=#E9E9E9
| 93291 ||  || — || September 24, 2000 || Socorro || LINEAR || — || align=right | 2.0 km || 
|-id=292 bgcolor=#E9E9E9
| 93292 ||  || — || September 24, 2000 || Socorro || LINEAR || — || align=right | 1.9 km || 
|-id=293 bgcolor=#E9E9E9
| 93293 ||  || — || September 24, 2000 || Socorro || LINEAR || NEM || align=right | 4.4 km || 
|-id=294 bgcolor=#E9E9E9
| 93294 ||  || — || September 24, 2000 || Socorro || LINEAR || — || align=right | 2.2 km || 
|-id=295 bgcolor=#E9E9E9
| 93295 ||  || — || September 24, 2000 || Socorro || LINEAR || — || align=right | 1.5 km || 
|-id=296 bgcolor=#E9E9E9
| 93296 ||  || — || September 24, 2000 || Socorro || LINEAR || — || align=right | 1.6 km || 
|-id=297 bgcolor=#E9E9E9
| 93297 ||  || — || September 24, 2000 || Socorro || LINEAR || — || align=right | 1.4 km || 
|-id=298 bgcolor=#E9E9E9
| 93298 ||  || — || September 24, 2000 || Socorro || LINEAR || — || align=right | 2.4 km || 
|-id=299 bgcolor=#E9E9E9
| 93299 ||  || — || September 24, 2000 || Socorro || LINEAR || GEF || align=right | 2.3 km || 
|-id=300 bgcolor=#E9E9E9
| 93300 ||  || — || September 24, 2000 || Socorro || LINEAR || — || align=right | 2.2 km || 
|}

93301–93400 

|-bgcolor=#E9E9E9
| 93301 ||  || — || September 24, 2000 || Socorro || LINEAR || — || align=right | 3.1 km || 
|-id=302 bgcolor=#E9E9E9
| 93302 ||  || — || September 24, 2000 || Socorro || LINEAR || — || align=right | 2.9 km || 
|-id=303 bgcolor=#E9E9E9
| 93303 ||  || — || September 24, 2000 || Socorro || LINEAR || — || align=right | 3.7 km || 
|-id=304 bgcolor=#E9E9E9
| 93304 ||  || — || September 24, 2000 || Socorro || LINEAR || — || align=right | 2.1 km || 
|-id=305 bgcolor=#E9E9E9
| 93305 ||  || — || September 24, 2000 || Socorro || LINEAR || — || align=right | 2.8 km || 
|-id=306 bgcolor=#E9E9E9
| 93306 ||  || — || September 25, 2000 || Socorro || LINEAR || RAF || align=right | 2.8 km || 
|-id=307 bgcolor=#E9E9E9
| 93307 ||  || — || September 25, 2000 || Socorro || LINEAR || — || align=right | 3.7 km || 
|-id=308 bgcolor=#E9E9E9
| 93308 ||  || — || September 25, 2000 || Socorro || LINEAR || MAR || align=right | 2.6 km || 
|-id=309 bgcolor=#E9E9E9
| 93309 ||  || — || September 25, 2000 || Socorro || LINEAR || — || align=right | 2.4 km || 
|-id=310 bgcolor=#E9E9E9
| 93310 ||  || — || September 25, 2000 || Socorro || LINEAR || — || align=right | 2.7 km || 
|-id=311 bgcolor=#fefefe
| 93311 ||  || — || September 25, 2000 || Socorro || LINEAR || SUL || align=right | 3.8 km || 
|-id=312 bgcolor=#E9E9E9
| 93312 ||  || — || September 26, 2000 || Socorro || LINEAR || — || align=right | 2.0 km || 
|-id=313 bgcolor=#E9E9E9
| 93313 ||  || — || September 26, 2000 || Socorro || LINEAR || — || align=right | 1.5 km || 
|-id=314 bgcolor=#E9E9E9
| 93314 ||  || — || September 26, 2000 || Socorro || LINEAR || HNS || align=right | 5.0 km || 
|-id=315 bgcolor=#E9E9E9
| 93315 ||  || — || September 26, 2000 || Socorro || LINEAR || PAD || align=right | 4.7 km || 
|-id=316 bgcolor=#fefefe
| 93316 ||  || — || September 26, 2000 || Socorro || LINEAR || V || align=right | 1.7 km || 
|-id=317 bgcolor=#E9E9E9
| 93317 ||  || — || September 26, 2000 || Socorro || LINEAR || — || align=right | 5.6 km || 
|-id=318 bgcolor=#E9E9E9
| 93318 ||  || — || September 26, 2000 || Socorro || LINEAR || RAF || align=right | 1.8 km || 
|-id=319 bgcolor=#E9E9E9
| 93319 ||  || — || September 26, 2000 || Socorro || LINEAR || EUN || align=right | 2.8 km || 
|-id=320 bgcolor=#E9E9E9
| 93320 ||  || — || September 26, 2000 || Socorro || LINEAR || — || align=right | 2.1 km || 
|-id=321 bgcolor=#E9E9E9
| 93321 ||  || — || September 26, 2000 || Socorro || LINEAR || EUN || align=right | 3.6 km || 
|-id=322 bgcolor=#E9E9E9
| 93322 ||  || — || September 26, 2000 || Socorro || LINEAR || — || align=right | 3.3 km || 
|-id=323 bgcolor=#E9E9E9
| 93323 ||  || — || September 26, 2000 || Socorro || LINEAR || — || align=right | 3.3 km || 
|-id=324 bgcolor=#E9E9E9
| 93324 ||  || — || September 27, 2000 || Socorro || LINEAR || MIS || align=right | 4.0 km || 
|-id=325 bgcolor=#E9E9E9
| 93325 ||  || — || September 27, 2000 || Socorro || LINEAR || — || align=right | 2.2 km || 
|-id=326 bgcolor=#E9E9E9
| 93326 ||  || — || September 27, 2000 || Socorro || LINEAR || EUN || align=right | 2.7 km || 
|-id=327 bgcolor=#E9E9E9
| 93327 ||  || — || September 28, 2000 || Socorro || LINEAR || — || align=right | 3.8 km || 
|-id=328 bgcolor=#E9E9E9
| 93328 ||  || — || September 28, 2000 || Socorro || LINEAR || — || align=right | 2.2 km || 
|-id=329 bgcolor=#E9E9E9
| 93329 ||  || — || September 28, 2000 || Socorro || LINEAR || — || align=right | 4.6 km || 
|-id=330 bgcolor=#E9E9E9
| 93330 ||  || — || September 28, 2000 || Socorro || LINEAR || — || align=right | 3.2 km || 
|-id=331 bgcolor=#E9E9E9
| 93331 ||  || — || September 30, 2000 || Socorro || LINEAR || — || align=right | 3.9 km || 
|-id=332 bgcolor=#fefefe
| 93332 ||  || — || September 24, 2000 || Socorro || LINEAR || ERI || align=right | 5.4 km || 
|-id=333 bgcolor=#fefefe
| 93333 ||  || — || September 24, 2000 || Socorro || LINEAR || MAS || align=right | 1.1 km || 
|-id=334 bgcolor=#E9E9E9
| 93334 ||  || — || September 24, 2000 || Socorro || LINEAR || — || align=right | 2.0 km || 
|-id=335 bgcolor=#E9E9E9
| 93335 ||  || — || September 24, 2000 || Socorro || LINEAR || — || align=right | 1.4 km || 
|-id=336 bgcolor=#E9E9E9
| 93336 ||  || — || September 24, 2000 || Socorro || LINEAR || EUN || align=right | 2.0 km || 
|-id=337 bgcolor=#E9E9E9
| 93337 ||  || — || September 24, 2000 || Socorro || LINEAR || — || align=right | 2.3 km || 
|-id=338 bgcolor=#E9E9E9
| 93338 ||  || — || September 24, 2000 || Socorro || LINEAR || — || align=right | 1.7 km || 
|-id=339 bgcolor=#fefefe
| 93339 ||  || — || September 24, 2000 || Socorro || LINEAR || V || align=right | 1.8 km || 
|-id=340 bgcolor=#fefefe
| 93340 ||  || — || September 24, 2000 || Socorro || LINEAR || NYS || align=right | 1.5 km || 
|-id=341 bgcolor=#E9E9E9
| 93341 ||  || — || September 24, 2000 || Socorro || LINEAR || — || align=right | 3.1 km || 
|-id=342 bgcolor=#E9E9E9
| 93342 ||  || — || September 24, 2000 || Socorro || LINEAR || — || align=right | 2.4 km || 
|-id=343 bgcolor=#fefefe
| 93343 ||  || — || September 24, 2000 || Socorro || LINEAR || V || align=right | 1.6 km || 
|-id=344 bgcolor=#E9E9E9
| 93344 ||  || — || September 24, 2000 || Socorro || LINEAR || — || align=right | 2.3 km || 
|-id=345 bgcolor=#fefefe
| 93345 ||  || — || September 24, 2000 || Socorro || LINEAR || ERI || align=right | 5.0 km || 
|-id=346 bgcolor=#E9E9E9
| 93346 ||  || — || September 24, 2000 || Socorro || LINEAR || — || align=right | 2.1 km || 
|-id=347 bgcolor=#fefefe
| 93347 ||  || — || September 24, 2000 || Socorro || LINEAR || NYS || align=right | 4.2 km || 
|-id=348 bgcolor=#E9E9E9
| 93348 ||  || — || September 24, 2000 || Socorro || LINEAR || — || align=right | 3.2 km || 
|-id=349 bgcolor=#fefefe
| 93349 ||  || — || September 24, 2000 || Socorro || LINEAR || NYS || align=right | 1.8 km || 
|-id=350 bgcolor=#E9E9E9
| 93350 ||  || — || September 24, 2000 || Socorro || LINEAR || — || align=right | 2.2 km || 
|-id=351 bgcolor=#E9E9E9
| 93351 ||  || — || September 24, 2000 || Socorro || LINEAR || MRX || align=right | 2.7 km || 
|-id=352 bgcolor=#E9E9E9
| 93352 ||  || — || September 24, 2000 || Socorro || LINEAR || — || align=right | 1.9 km || 
|-id=353 bgcolor=#E9E9E9
| 93353 ||  || — || September 24, 2000 || Socorro || LINEAR || — || align=right | 2.8 km || 
|-id=354 bgcolor=#E9E9E9
| 93354 ||  || — || September 24, 2000 || Socorro || LINEAR || HEN || align=right | 2.5 km || 
|-id=355 bgcolor=#E9E9E9
| 93355 ||  || — || September 24, 2000 || Socorro || LINEAR || — || align=right | 1.7 km || 
|-id=356 bgcolor=#E9E9E9
| 93356 ||  || — || September 24, 2000 || Socorro || LINEAR || HNS || align=right | 3.2 km || 
|-id=357 bgcolor=#E9E9E9
| 93357 ||  || — || September 24, 2000 || Socorro || LINEAR || PAD || align=right | 3.2 km || 
|-id=358 bgcolor=#E9E9E9
| 93358 ||  || — || September 24, 2000 || Socorro || LINEAR || — || align=right | 2.3 km || 
|-id=359 bgcolor=#E9E9E9
| 93359 ||  || — || September 24, 2000 || Socorro || LINEAR || — || align=right | 5.9 km || 
|-id=360 bgcolor=#E9E9E9
| 93360 ||  || — || September 25, 2000 || Socorro || LINEAR || — || align=right | 3.6 km || 
|-id=361 bgcolor=#E9E9E9
| 93361 ||  || — || September 25, 2000 || Socorro || LINEAR || — || align=right | 2.7 km || 
|-id=362 bgcolor=#E9E9E9
| 93362 ||  || — || September 26, 2000 || Socorro || LINEAR || — || align=right | 2.1 km || 
|-id=363 bgcolor=#E9E9E9
| 93363 ||  || — || September 26, 2000 || Socorro || LINEAR || — || align=right | 1.7 km || 
|-id=364 bgcolor=#E9E9E9
| 93364 ||  || — || September 26, 2000 || Socorro || LINEAR || — || align=right | 3.8 km || 
|-id=365 bgcolor=#E9E9E9
| 93365 ||  || — || September 26, 2000 || Socorro || LINEAR || — || align=right | 2.7 km || 
|-id=366 bgcolor=#E9E9E9
| 93366 ||  || — || September 27, 2000 || Socorro || LINEAR || — || align=right | 2.0 km || 
|-id=367 bgcolor=#E9E9E9
| 93367 ||  || — || September 27, 2000 || Socorro || LINEAR || — || align=right | 3.5 km || 
|-id=368 bgcolor=#E9E9E9
| 93368 ||  || — || September 27, 2000 || Socorro || LINEAR || EUN || align=right | 3.6 km || 
|-id=369 bgcolor=#E9E9E9
| 93369 ||  || — || September 27, 2000 || Socorro || LINEAR || — || align=right | 2.8 km || 
|-id=370 bgcolor=#E9E9E9
| 93370 ||  || — || September 27, 2000 || Socorro || LINEAR || — || align=right | 1.6 km || 
|-id=371 bgcolor=#E9E9E9
| 93371 ||  || — || September 27, 2000 || Socorro || LINEAR || — || align=right | 3.1 km || 
|-id=372 bgcolor=#E9E9E9
| 93372 ||  || — || September 27, 2000 || Socorro || LINEAR || — || align=right | 3.6 km || 
|-id=373 bgcolor=#E9E9E9
| 93373 ||  || — || September 27, 2000 || Socorro || LINEAR || — || align=right | 2.3 km || 
|-id=374 bgcolor=#E9E9E9
| 93374 ||  || — || September 27, 2000 || Socorro || LINEAR || — || align=right | 3.9 km || 
|-id=375 bgcolor=#fefefe
| 93375 ||  || — || September 27, 2000 || Socorro || LINEAR || — || align=right | 2.7 km || 
|-id=376 bgcolor=#E9E9E9
| 93376 ||  || — || September 27, 2000 || Socorro || LINEAR || — || align=right | 5.4 km || 
|-id=377 bgcolor=#E9E9E9
| 93377 ||  || — || September 27, 2000 || Socorro || LINEAR || — || align=right | 2.3 km || 
|-id=378 bgcolor=#E9E9E9
| 93378 ||  || — || September 27, 2000 || Socorro || LINEAR || — || align=right | 3.3 km || 
|-id=379 bgcolor=#E9E9E9
| 93379 ||  || — || September 28, 2000 || Socorro || LINEAR || HNS || align=right | 3.1 km || 
|-id=380 bgcolor=#E9E9E9
| 93380 ||  || — || September 28, 2000 || Socorro || LINEAR || — || align=right | 2.0 km || 
|-id=381 bgcolor=#E9E9E9
| 93381 ||  || — || September 30, 2000 || Socorro || LINEAR || — || align=right | 2.3 km || 
|-id=382 bgcolor=#E9E9E9
| 93382 ||  || — || September 30, 2000 || Socorro || LINEAR || — || align=right | 2.8 km || 
|-id=383 bgcolor=#E9E9E9
| 93383 ||  || — || September 30, 2000 || Socorro || LINEAR || — || align=right | 1.9 km || 
|-id=384 bgcolor=#E9E9E9
| 93384 ||  || — || September 30, 2000 || Socorro || LINEAR || — || align=right | 2.8 km || 
|-id=385 bgcolor=#E9E9E9
| 93385 ||  || — || September 30, 2000 || Socorro || LINEAR || MAR || align=right | 2.4 km || 
|-id=386 bgcolor=#E9E9E9
| 93386 ||  || — || September 30, 2000 || Socorro || LINEAR || JUN || align=right | 3.5 km || 
|-id=387 bgcolor=#E9E9E9
| 93387 ||  || — || September 25, 2000 || Socorro || LINEAR || — || align=right | 2.7 km || 
|-id=388 bgcolor=#E9E9E9
| 93388 ||  || — || September 25, 2000 || Socorro || LINEAR || — || align=right | 3.6 km || 
|-id=389 bgcolor=#E9E9E9
| 93389 ||  || — || September 30, 2000 || Socorro || LINEAR || — || align=right | 4.9 km || 
|-id=390 bgcolor=#fefefe
| 93390 ||  || — || September 23, 2000 || Socorro || LINEAR || — || align=right | 3.5 km || 
|-id=391 bgcolor=#E9E9E9
| 93391 ||  || — || September 23, 2000 || Socorro || LINEAR || — || align=right | 2.8 km || 
|-id=392 bgcolor=#E9E9E9
| 93392 ||  || — || September 23, 2000 || Socorro || LINEAR || — || align=right | 2.4 km || 
|-id=393 bgcolor=#E9E9E9
| 93393 ||  || — || September 23, 2000 || Socorro || LINEAR || — || align=right | 4.5 km || 
|-id=394 bgcolor=#fefefe
| 93394 ||  || — || September 23, 2000 || Socorro || LINEAR || V || align=right | 2.3 km || 
|-id=395 bgcolor=#fefefe
| 93395 ||  || — || September 26, 2000 || Socorro || LINEAR || — || align=right | 2.1 km || 
|-id=396 bgcolor=#E9E9E9
| 93396 ||  || — || September 26, 2000 || Socorro || LINEAR || MAR || align=right | 2.5 km || 
|-id=397 bgcolor=#E9E9E9
| 93397 ||  || — || September 26, 2000 || Socorro || LINEAR || — || align=right | 5.6 km || 
|-id=398 bgcolor=#E9E9E9
| 93398 ||  || — || September 26, 2000 || Socorro || LINEAR || JUN || align=right | 8.2 km || 
|-id=399 bgcolor=#E9E9E9
| 93399 ||  || — || September 26, 2000 || Socorro || LINEAR || — || align=right | 3.4 km || 
|-id=400 bgcolor=#E9E9E9
| 93400 ||  || — || September 27, 2000 || Socorro || LINEAR || — || align=right | 2.9 km || 
|}

93401–93500 

|-bgcolor=#E9E9E9
| 93401 ||  || — || September 27, 2000 || Socorro || LINEAR || EUN || align=right | 2.7 km || 
|-id=402 bgcolor=#fefefe
| 93402 ||  || — || September 27, 2000 || Socorro || LINEAR || — || align=right | 4.1 km || 
|-id=403 bgcolor=#E9E9E9
| 93403 ||  || — || September 27, 2000 || Socorro || LINEAR || — || align=right | 3.9 km || 
|-id=404 bgcolor=#E9E9E9
| 93404 ||  || — || September 27, 2000 || Socorro || LINEAR || EUN || align=right | 2.7 km || 
|-id=405 bgcolor=#E9E9E9
| 93405 ||  || — || September 27, 2000 || Socorro || LINEAR || — || align=right | 2.3 km || 
|-id=406 bgcolor=#E9E9E9
| 93406 ||  || — || September 27, 2000 || Socorro || LINEAR || HNS || align=right | 3.9 km || 
|-id=407 bgcolor=#E9E9E9
| 93407 ||  || — || September 27, 2000 || Socorro || LINEAR || — || align=right | 3.2 km || 
|-id=408 bgcolor=#E9E9E9
| 93408 ||  || — || September 27, 2000 || Socorro || LINEAR || — || align=right | 3.2 km || 
|-id=409 bgcolor=#E9E9E9
| 93409 ||  || — || September 28, 2000 || Socorro || LINEAR || — || align=right | 2.4 km || 
|-id=410 bgcolor=#E9E9E9
| 93410 ||  || — || September 28, 2000 || Socorro || LINEAR || — || align=right | 3.8 km || 
|-id=411 bgcolor=#fefefe
| 93411 ||  || — || September 28, 2000 || Socorro || LINEAR || V || align=right | 1.7 km || 
|-id=412 bgcolor=#E9E9E9
| 93412 ||  || — || September 28, 2000 || Socorro || LINEAR || — || align=right | 1.8 km || 
|-id=413 bgcolor=#E9E9E9
| 93413 ||  || — || September 28, 2000 || Socorro || LINEAR || — || align=right | 1.8 km || 
|-id=414 bgcolor=#E9E9E9
| 93414 ||  || — || September 28, 2000 || Socorro || LINEAR || — || align=right | 2.9 km || 
|-id=415 bgcolor=#E9E9E9
| 93415 ||  || — || September 28, 2000 || Socorro || LINEAR || — || align=right | 3.6 km || 
|-id=416 bgcolor=#E9E9E9
| 93416 ||  || — || September 28, 2000 || Socorro || LINEAR || — || align=right | 2.1 km || 
|-id=417 bgcolor=#E9E9E9
| 93417 ||  || — || September 28, 2000 || Socorro || LINEAR || — || align=right | 7.5 km || 
|-id=418 bgcolor=#E9E9E9
| 93418 ||  || — || September 30, 2000 || Socorro || LINEAR || — || align=right | 5.2 km || 
|-id=419 bgcolor=#E9E9E9
| 93419 ||  || — || September 30, 2000 || Socorro || LINEAR || EUN || align=right | 2.3 km || 
|-id=420 bgcolor=#E9E9E9
| 93420 ||  || — || September 30, 2000 || Socorro || LINEAR || — || align=right | 3.4 km || 
|-id=421 bgcolor=#E9E9E9
| 93421 ||  || — || September 30, 2000 || Socorro || LINEAR || EUN || align=right | 2.6 km || 
|-id=422 bgcolor=#E9E9E9
| 93422 ||  || — || September 30, 2000 || Socorro || LINEAR || — || align=right | 2.3 km || 
|-id=423 bgcolor=#E9E9E9
| 93423 ||  || — || September 30, 2000 || Socorro || LINEAR || — || align=right | 4.8 km || 
|-id=424 bgcolor=#E9E9E9
| 93424 ||  || — || September 27, 2000 || Socorro || LINEAR || — || align=right | 2.7 km || 
|-id=425 bgcolor=#E9E9E9
| 93425 ||  || — || September 27, 2000 || Socorro || LINEAR || — || align=right | 3.0 km || 
|-id=426 bgcolor=#E9E9E9
| 93426 ||  || — || September 28, 2000 || Socorro || LINEAR || — || align=right | 2.6 km || 
|-id=427 bgcolor=#fefefe
| 93427 ||  || — || September 30, 2000 || Socorro || LINEAR || — || align=right | 2.8 km || 
|-id=428 bgcolor=#E9E9E9
| 93428 ||  || — || September 30, 2000 || Socorro || LINEAR || EUN || align=right | 2.3 km || 
|-id=429 bgcolor=#E9E9E9
| 93429 ||  || — || September 30, 2000 || Socorro || LINEAR || EUN || align=right | 2.4 km || 
|-id=430 bgcolor=#E9E9E9
| 93430 ||  || — || September 30, 2000 || Socorro || LINEAR || — || align=right | 2.7 km || 
|-id=431 bgcolor=#E9E9E9
| 93431 ||  || — || September 30, 2000 || Socorro || LINEAR || — || align=right | 4.4 km || 
|-id=432 bgcolor=#fefefe
| 93432 ||  || — || September 26, 2000 || Socorro || LINEAR || — || align=right | 6.0 km || 
|-id=433 bgcolor=#E9E9E9
| 93433 ||  || — || September 26, 2000 || Socorro || LINEAR || EUN || align=right | 4.1 km || 
|-id=434 bgcolor=#E9E9E9
| 93434 ||  || — || September 26, 2000 || Socorro || LINEAR || CLO || align=right | 6.3 km || 
|-id=435 bgcolor=#E9E9E9
| 93435 ||  || — || September 27, 2000 || Socorro || LINEAR || — || align=right | 2.9 km || 
|-id=436 bgcolor=#E9E9E9
| 93436 ||  || — || September 29, 2000 || Kitt Peak || Spacewatch || — || align=right | 3.1 km || 
|-id=437 bgcolor=#E9E9E9
| 93437 ||  || — || September 29, 2000 || Haleakala || NEAT || JUN || align=right | 3.4 km || 
|-id=438 bgcolor=#E9E9E9
| 93438 ||  || — || September 30, 2000 || Socorro || LINEAR || — || align=right | 3.1 km || 
|-id=439 bgcolor=#E9E9E9
| 93439 ||  || — || September 30, 2000 || Socorro || LINEAR || — || align=right | 5.2 km || 
|-id=440 bgcolor=#E9E9E9
| 93440 ||  || — || September 27, 2000 || Socorro || LINEAR || HNS || align=right | 3.1 km || 
|-id=441 bgcolor=#E9E9E9
| 93441 ||  || — || September 27, 2000 || Kitt Peak || Spacewatch || MIS || align=right | 4.1 km || 
|-id=442 bgcolor=#fefefe
| 93442 ||  || — || September 26, 2000 || Haleakala || NEAT || NYS || align=right | 1.6 km || 
|-id=443 bgcolor=#E9E9E9
| 93443 ||  || — || September 26, 2000 || Haleakala || NEAT || — || align=right | 2.2 km || 
|-id=444 bgcolor=#E9E9E9
| 93444 ||  || — || September 26, 2000 || Haleakala || NEAT || DOR || align=right | 6.1 km || 
|-id=445 bgcolor=#E9E9E9
| 93445 ||  || — || September 26, 2000 || Haleakala || NEAT || — || align=right | 4.6 km || 
|-id=446 bgcolor=#fefefe
| 93446 ||  || — || September 25, 2000 || Kitt Peak || Spacewatch || — || align=right | 2.8 km || 
|-id=447 bgcolor=#E9E9E9
| 93447 ||  || — || September 25, 2000 || Kitt Peak || Spacewatch || — || align=right | 3.5 km || 
|-id=448 bgcolor=#E9E9E9
| 93448 ||  || — || September 20, 2000 || Socorro || LINEAR || — || align=right | 5.7 km || 
|-id=449 bgcolor=#E9E9E9
| 93449 ||  || — || September 25, 2000 || Socorro || LINEAR || — || align=right | 4.5 km || 
|-id=450 bgcolor=#E9E9E9
| 93450 ||  || — || September 22, 2000 || Socorro || LINEAR || HNS || align=right | 2.6 km || 
|-id=451 bgcolor=#E9E9E9
| 93451 ||  || — || September 30, 2000 || Anderson Mesa || LONEOS || EUN || align=right | 2.3 km || 
|-id=452 bgcolor=#E9E9E9
| 93452 ||  || — || September 29, 2000 || Anderson Mesa || LONEOS || EUN || align=right | 2.8 km || 
|-id=453 bgcolor=#E9E9E9
| 93453 ||  || — || September 26, 2000 || Anderson Mesa || LONEOS || — || align=right | 1.8 km || 
|-id=454 bgcolor=#E9E9E9
| 93454 ||  || — || September 30, 2000 || Anderson Mesa || LONEOS || EUN || align=right | 3.5 km || 
|-id=455 bgcolor=#E9E9E9
| 93455 ||  || — || September 30, 2000 || Anderson Mesa || LONEOS || — || align=right | 4.5 km || 
|-id=456 bgcolor=#E9E9E9
| 93456 ||  || — || September 28, 2000 || Anderson Mesa || LONEOS || — || align=right | 6.9 km || 
|-id=457 bgcolor=#E9E9E9
| 93457 ||  || — || September 25, 2000 || Socorro || LINEAR || — || align=right | 2.5 km || 
|-id=458 bgcolor=#E9E9E9
| 93458 ||  || — || September 25, 2000 || Haleakala || NEAT || — || align=right | 2.5 km || 
|-id=459 bgcolor=#E9E9E9
| 93459 ||  || — || September 26, 2000 || Anderson Mesa || LONEOS || GEF || align=right | 2.5 km || 
|-id=460 bgcolor=#E9E9E9
| 93460 ||  || — || September 22, 2000 || Anderson Mesa || LONEOS || — || align=right | 2.0 km || 
|-id=461 bgcolor=#fefefe
| 93461 ||  || — || September 20, 2000 || Socorro || LINEAR || — || align=right | 1.6 km || 
|-id=462 bgcolor=#E9E9E9
| 93462 ||  || — || September 22, 2000 || Haleakala || NEAT || — || align=right | 2.4 km || 
|-id=463 bgcolor=#E9E9E9
| 93463 ||  || — || September 24, 2000 || Socorro || LINEAR || — || align=right | 2.5 km || 
|-id=464 bgcolor=#E9E9E9
| 93464 ||  || — || September 23, 2000 || Anderson Mesa || LONEOS || — || align=right | 1.8 km || 
|-id=465 bgcolor=#E9E9E9
| 93465 ||  || — || September 24, 2000 || Anderson Mesa || LONEOS || RAF || align=right | 1.6 km || 
|-id=466 bgcolor=#E9E9E9
| 93466 || 2000 TO || — || October 2, 2000 || Emerald Lane || L. Ball || DOR || align=right | 5.4 km || 
|-id=467 bgcolor=#fefefe
| 93467 ||  || — || October 1, 2000 || Socorro || LINEAR || — || align=right | 1.8 km || 
|-id=468 bgcolor=#fefefe
| 93468 ||  || — || October 1, 2000 || Socorro || LINEAR || NYS || align=right | 1.6 km || 
|-id=469 bgcolor=#E9E9E9
| 93469 ||  || — || October 1, 2000 || Socorro || LINEAR || — || align=right | 1.9 km || 
|-id=470 bgcolor=#E9E9E9
| 93470 ||  || — || October 1, 2000 || Socorro || LINEAR || — || align=right | 3.4 km || 
|-id=471 bgcolor=#E9E9E9
| 93471 ||  || — || October 1, 2000 || Socorro || LINEAR || — || align=right | 5.2 km || 
|-id=472 bgcolor=#E9E9E9
| 93472 ||  || — || October 1, 2000 || Socorro || LINEAR || — || align=right | 2.8 km || 
|-id=473 bgcolor=#E9E9E9
| 93473 ||  || — || October 1, 2000 || Socorro || LINEAR || — || align=right | 3.1 km || 
|-id=474 bgcolor=#E9E9E9
| 93474 ||  || — || October 1, 2000 || Socorro || LINEAR || HEN || align=right | 1.8 km || 
|-id=475 bgcolor=#d6d6d6
| 93475 ||  || — || October 1, 2000 || Socorro || LINEAR || AEG || align=right | 8.1 km || 
|-id=476 bgcolor=#E9E9E9
| 93476 ||  || — || October 1, 2000 || Socorro || LINEAR || GEF || align=right | 2.2 km || 
|-id=477 bgcolor=#E9E9E9
| 93477 ||  || — || October 1, 2000 || Socorro || LINEAR || AER || align=right | 3.1 km || 
|-id=478 bgcolor=#E9E9E9
| 93478 ||  || — || October 1, 2000 || Socorro || LINEAR || — || align=right | 2.0 km || 
|-id=479 bgcolor=#E9E9E9
| 93479 ||  || — || October 1, 2000 || Socorro || LINEAR || RAF || align=right | 2.6 km || 
|-id=480 bgcolor=#E9E9E9
| 93480 ||  || — || October 1, 2000 || Socorro || LINEAR || — || align=right | 1.9 km || 
|-id=481 bgcolor=#E9E9E9
| 93481 ||  || — || October 1, 2000 || Socorro || LINEAR || EUN || align=right | 2.6 km || 
|-id=482 bgcolor=#E9E9E9
| 93482 ||  || — || October 1, 2000 || Socorro || LINEAR || EUN || align=right | 1.9 km || 
|-id=483 bgcolor=#E9E9E9
| 93483 ||  || — || October 3, 2000 || Socorro || LINEAR || GEF || align=right | 2.8 km || 
|-id=484 bgcolor=#E9E9E9
| 93484 ||  || — || October 5, 2000 || Prescott || P. G. Comba || RAF || align=right | 1.7 km || 
|-id=485 bgcolor=#E9E9E9
| 93485 ||  || — || October 2, 2000 || Socorro || LINEAR || — || align=right | 2.5 km || 
|-id=486 bgcolor=#fefefe
| 93486 ||  || — || October 2, 2000 || Socorro || LINEAR || — || align=right | 2.5 km || 
|-id=487 bgcolor=#E9E9E9
| 93487 ||  || — || October 1, 2000 || Socorro || LINEAR || — || align=right | 3.6 km || 
|-id=488 bgcolor=#E9E9E9
| 93488 ||  || — || October 2, 2000 || Socorro || LINEAR || — || align=right | 4.7 km || 
|-id=489 bgcolor=#E9E9E9
| 93489 ||  || — || October 5, 2000 || Socorro || LINEAR || RAF || align=right | 5.5 km || 
|-id=490 bgcolor=#E9E9E9
| 93490 ||  || — || October 8, 2000 || Emerald Lane || L. Ball || — || align=right | 3.5 km || 
|-id=491 bgcolor=#E9E9E9
| 93491 ||  || — || October 7, 2000 || Desert Beaver || W. K. Y. Yeung || — || align=right | 4.2 km || 
|-id=492 bgcolor=#E9E9E9
| 93492 ||  || — || October 6, 2000 || Anderson Mesa || LONEOS || — || align=right | 2.5 km || 
|-id=493 bgcolor=#E9E9E9
| 93493 ||  || — || October 1, 2000 || Socorro || LINEAR || EUN || align=right | 6.5 km || 
|-id=494 bgcolor=#E9E9E9
| 93494 ||  || — || October 1, 2000 || Socorro || LINEAR || — || align=right | 4.6 km || 
|-id=495 bgcolor=#fefefe
| 93495 ||  || — || October 1, 2000 || Socorro || LINEAR || V || align=right | 1.8 km || 
|-id=496 bgcolor=#E9E9E9
| 93496 ||  || — || October 1, 2000 || Socorro || LINEAR || — || align=right | 4.8 km || 
|-id=497 bgcolor=#fefefe
| 93497 ||  || — || October 1, 2000 || Socorro || LINEAR || — || align=right | 1.6 km || 
|-id=498 bgcolor=#E9E9E9
| 93498 ||  || — || October 1, 2000 || Socorro || LINEAR || EUN || align=right | 2.7 km || 
|-id=499 bgcolor=#E9E9E9
| 93499 ||  || — || October 1, 2000 || Anderson Mesa || LONEOS || — || align=right | 2.2 km || 
|-id=500 bgcolor=#E9E9E9
| 93500 ||  || — || October 1, 2000 || Socorro || LINEAR || EUN || align=right | 3.4 km || 
|}

93501–93600 

|-bgcolor=#E9E9E9
| 93501 ||  || — || October 1, 2000 || Socorro || LINEAR || — || align=right | 3.1 km || 
|-id=502 bgcolor=#E9E9E9
| 93502 ||  || — || October 1, 2000 || Socorro || LINEAR || KRM || align=right | 6.0 km || 
|-id=503 bgcolor=#E9E9E9
| 93503 ||  || — || October 1, 2000 || Socorro || LINEAR || — || align=right | 2.9 km || 
|-id=504 bgcolor=#E9E9E9
| 93504 ||  || — || October 1, 2000 || Socorro || LINEAR || — || align=right | 3.0 km || 
|-id=505 bgcolor=#E9E9E9
| 93505 ||  || — || October 1, 2000 || Socorro || LINEAR || MAR || align=right | 2.3 km || 
|-id=506 bgcolor=#E9E9E9
| 93506 ||  || — || October 1, 2000 || Socorro || LINEAR || HOF || align=right | 4.8 km || 
|-id=507 bgcolor=#E9E9E9
| 93507 ||  || — || October 1, 2000 || Socorro || LINEAR || — || align=right | 3.5 km || 
|-id=508 bgcolor=#E9E9E9
| 93508 ||  || — || October 1, 2000 || Kitt Peak || Spacewatch || — || align=right | 3.9 km || 
|-id=509 bgcolor=#E9E9E9
| 93509 ||  || — || October 2, 2000 || Anderson Mesa || LONEOS || — || align=right | 4.8 km || 
|-id=510 bgcolor=#fefefe
| 93510 ||  || — || October 2, 2000 || Socorro || LINEAR || V || align=right | 1.7 km || 
|-id=511 bgcolor=#E9E9E9
| 93511 ||  || — || October 2, 2000 || Anderson Mesa || LONEOS || — || align=right | 3.2 km || 
|-id=512 bgcolor=#E9E9E9
| 93512 ||  || — || October 2, 2000 || Anderson Mesa || LONEOS || — || align=right | 2.9 km || 
|-id=513 bgcolor=#E9E9E9
| 93513 ||  || — || October 2, 2000 || Anderson Mesa || LONEOS || — || align=right | 3.2 km || 
|-id=514 bgcolor=#E9E9E9
| 93514 ||  || — || October 2, 2000 || Anderson Mesa || LONEOS || JUN || align=right | 5.3 km || 
|-id=515 bgcolor=#E9E9E9
| 93515 ||  || — || October 2, 2000 || Socorro || LINEAR || — || align=right | 1.8 km || 
|-id=516 bgcolor=#E9E9E9
| 93516 ||  || — || October 2, 2000 || Socorro || LINEAR || — || align=right | 2.0 km || 
|-id=517 bgcolor=#E9E9E9
| 93517 ||  || — || October 3, 2000 || Anderson Mesa || LONEOS || — || align=right | 2.9 km || 
|-id=518 bgcolor=#E9E9E9
| 93518 ||  || — || October 3, 2000 || Socorro || LINEAR || — || align=right | 2.2 km || 
|-id=519 bgcolor=#E9E9E9
| 93519 ||  || — || October 3, 2000 || Socorro || LINEAR || — || align=right | 3.2 km || 
|-id=520 bgcolor=#fefefe
| 93520 ||  || — || October 3, 2000 || Socorro || LINEAR || — || align=right | 3.6 km || 
|-id=521 bgcolor=#E9E9E9
| 93521 ||  || — || October 1, 2000 || Socorro || LINEAR || — || align=right | 3.7 km || 
|-id=522 bgcolor=#E9E9E9
| 93522 ||  || — || October 2, 2000 || Socorro || LINEAR || — || align=right | 1.7 km || 
|-id=523 bgcolor=#E9E9E9
| 93523 ||  || — || October 2, 2000 || Socorro || LINEAR || — || align=right | 3.2 km || 
|-id=524 bgcolor=#E9E9E9
| 93524 || 2000 UQ || — || October 20, 2000 || Ondřejov || P. Kušnirák || — || align=right | 5.1 km || 
|-id=525 bgcolor=#E9E9E9
| 93525 || 2000 UX || — || October 21, 2000 || Višnjan Observatory || K. Korlević || ADE || align=right | 6.8 km || 
|-id=526 bgcolor=#d6d6d6
| 93526 || 2000 UY || — || October 21, 2000 || Višnjan Observatory || K. Korlević || — || align=right | 5.8 km || 
|-id=527 bgcolor=#d6d6d6
| 93527 ||  || — || October 31, 2000 || Socorro || LINEAR || Tj (2.94) || align=right | 5.6 km || 
|-id=528 bgcolor=#E9E9E9
| 93528 ||  || — || October 24, 2000 || Socorro || LINEAR || EUN || align=right | 2.7 km || 
|-id=529 bgcolor=#E9E9E9
| 93529 ||  || — || October 24, 2000 || Socorro || LINEAR || — || align=right | 2.3 km || 
|-id=530 bgcolor=#E9E9E9
| 93530 ||  || — || October 24, 2000 || Socorro || LINEAR || — || align=right | 2.3 km || 
|-id=531 bgcolor=#E9E9E9
| 93531 ||  || — || October 24, 2000 || Socorro || LINEAR || EUN || align=right | 2.3 km || 
|-id=532 bgcolor=#fefefe
| 93532 ||  || — || October 24, 2000 || Socorro || LINEAR || V || align=right | 2.2 km || 
|-id=533 bgcolor=#E9E9E9
| 93533 ||  || — || October 24, 2000 || Socorro || LINEAR || — || align=right | 4.1 km || 
|-id=534 bgcolor=#E9E9E9
| 93534 ||  || — || October 27, 2000 || Desert Beaver || W. K. Y. Yeung || — || align=right | 3.3 km || 
|-id=535 bgcolor=#fefefe
| 93535 ||  || — || October 24, 2000 || Socorro || LINEAR || — || align=right | 2.8 km || 
|-id=536 bgcolor=#E9E9E9
| 93536 ||  || — || October 25, 2000 || Socorro || LINEAR || — || align=right | 4.3 km || 
|-id=537 bgcolor=#E9E9E9
| 93537 ||  || — || October 25, 2000 || Socorro || LINEAR || — || align=right | 7.3 km || 
|-id=538 bgcolor=#E9E9E9
| 93538 ||  || — || October 24, 2000 || Socorro || LINEAR || AEO || align=right | 2.3 km || 
|-id=539 bgcolor=#E9E9E9
| 93539 ||  || — || October 24, 2000 || Socorro || LINEAR || — || align=right | 3.7 km || 
|-id=540 bgcolor=#E9E9E9
| 93540 ||  || — || October 29, 2000 || Socorro || LINEAR || EUN || align=right | 2.6 km || 
|-id=541 bgcolor=#E9E9E9
| 93541 ||  || — || October 24, 2000 || Socorro || LINEAR || — || align=right | 4.8 km || 
|-id=542 bgcolor=#E9E9E9
| 93542 ||  || — || October 24, 2000 || Socorro || LINEAR || — || align=right | 4.4 km || 
|-id=543 bgcolor=#E9E9E9
| 93543 ||  || — || October 24, 2000 || Socorro || LINEAR || HOF || align=right | 4.5 km || 
|-id=544 bgcolor=#E9E9E9
| 93544 ||  || — || October 24, 2000 || Socorro || LINEAR || — || align=right | 3.9 km || 
|-id=545 bgcolor=#E9E9E9
| 93545 ||  || — || October 24, 2000 || Socorro || LINEAR || — || align=right | 4.0 km || 
|-id=546 bgcolor=#E9E9E9
| 93546 ||  || — || October 24, 2000 || Socorro || LINEAR || — || align=right | 5.1 km || 
|-id=547 bgcolor=#E9E9E9
| 93547 ||  || — || October 24, 2000 || Socorro || LINEAR || — || align=right | 1.9 km || 
|-id=548 bgcolor=#E9E9E9
| 93548 ||  || — || October 24, 2000 || Socorro || LINEAR || — || align=right | 2.5 km || 
|-id=549 bgcolor=#E9E9E9
| 93549 ||  || — || October 24, 2000 || Socorro || LINEAR || — || align=right | 5.0 km || 
|-id=550 bgcolor=#E9E9E9
| 93550 ||  || — || October 24, 2000 || Socorro || LINEAR || RAF || align=right | 2.2 km || 
|-id=551 bgcolor=#E9E9E9
| 93551 ||  || — || October 24, 2000 || Socorro || LINEAR || — || align=right | 3.7 km || 
|-id=552 bgcolor=#E9E9E9
| 93552 ||  || — || October 24, 2000 || Socorro || LINEAR || — || align=right | 4.2 km || 
|-id=553 bgcolor=#E9E9E9
| 93553 ||  || — || October 24, 2000 || Socorro || LINEAR || — || align=right | 3.7 km || 
|-id=554 bgcolor=#E9E9E9
| 93554 ||  || — || October 24, 2000 || Socorro || LINEAR || — || align=right | 2.1 km || 
|-id=555 bgcolor=#E9E9E9
| 93555 ||  || — || October 24, 2000 || Socorro || LINEAR || — || align=right | 2.5 km || 
|-id=556 bgcolor=#E9E9E9
| 93556 ||  || — || October 29, 2000 || Kitt Peak || Spacewatch || — || align=right | 2.6 km || 
|-id=557 bgcolor=#E9E9E9
| 93557 ||  || — || October 24, 2000 || Socorro || LINEAR || — || align=right | 4.1 km || 
|-id=558 bgcolor=#E9E9E9
| 93558 ||  || — || October 24, 2000 || Socorro || LINEAR || — || align=right | 2.8 km || 
|-id=559 bgcolor=#E9E9E9
| 93559 ||  || — || October 24, 2000 || Socorro || LINEAR || — || align=right | 2.4 km || 
|-id=560 bgcolor=#E9E9E9
| 93560 ||  || — || October 24, 2000 || Socorro || LINEAR || — || align=right | 1.7 km || 
|-id=561 bgcolor=#E9E9E9
| 93561 ||  || — || October 24, 2000 || Socorro || LINEAR || — || align=right | 5.7 km || 
|-id=562 bgcolor=#E9E9E9
| 93562 ||  || — || October 24, 2000 || Socorro || LINEAR || — || align=right | 5.7 km || 
|-id=563 bgcolor=#d6d6d6
| 93563 ||  || — || October 24, 2000 || Socorro || LINEAR || — || align=right | 8.0 km || 
|-id=564 bgcolor=#E9E9E9
| 93564 ||  || — || October 24, 2000 || Socorro || LINEAR || — || align=right | 3.1 km || 
|-id=565 bgcolor=#E9E9E9
| 93565 ||  || — || October 24, 2000 || Socorro || LINEAR || — || align=right | 4.1 km || 
|-id=566 bgcolor=#E9E9E9
| 93566 ||  || — || October 24, 2000 || Socorro || LINEAR || NEM || align=right | 4.3 km || 
|-id=567 bgcolor=#E9E9E9
| 93567 ||  || — || October 24, 2000 || Socorro || LINEAR || HEN || align=right | 1.9 km || 
|-id=568 bgcolor=#E9E9E9
| 93568 ||  || — || October 24, 2000 || Socorro || LINEAR || EUN || align=right | 3.7 km || 
|-id=569 bgcolor=#E9E9E9
| 93569 ||  || — || October 24, 2000 || Socorro || LINEAR || HOF || align=right | 6.1 km || 
|-id=570 bgcolor=#E9E9E9
| 93570 ||  || — || October 24, 2000 || Socorro || LINEAR || — || align=right | 3.4 km || 
|-id=571 bgcolor=#E9E9E9
| 93571 ||  || — || October 24, 2000 || Socorro || LINEAR || — || align=right | 2.6 km || 
|-id=572 bgcolor=#E9E9E9
| 93572 ||  || — || October 24, 2000 || Socorro || LINEAR || — || align=right | 2.8 km || 
|-id=573 bgcolor=#E9E9E9
| 93573 ||  || — || October 24, 2000 || Socorro || LINEAR || — || align=right | 4.2 km || 
|-id=574 bgcolor=#E9E9E9
| 93574 ||  || — || October 24, 2000 || Socorro || LINEAR || — || align=right | 3.4 km || 
|-id=575 bgcolor=#E9E9E9
| 93575 ||  || — || October 24, 2000 || Socorro || LINEAR || — || align=right | 3.3 km || 
|-id=576 bgcolor=#E9E9E9
| 93576 ||  || — || October 24, 2000 || Socorro || LINEAR || — || align=right | 1.9 km || 
|-id=577 bgcolor=#E9E9E9
| 93577 ||  || — || October 24, 2000 || Socorro || LINEAR || — || align=right | 2.6 km || 
|-id=578 bgcolor=#E9E9E9
| 93578 ||  || — || October 24, 2000 || Socorro || LINEAR || — || align=right | 2.1 km || 
|-id=579 bgcolor=#d6d6d6
| 93579 ||  || — || October 24, 2000 || Socorro || LINEAR || BRA || align=right | 4.9 km || 
|-id=580 bgcolor=#E9E9E9
| 93580 ||  || — || October 24, 2000 || Socorro || LINEAR || — || align=right | 2.1 km || 
|-id=581 bgcolor=#E9E9E9
| 93581 ||  || — || October 24, 2000 || Socorro || LINEAR || — || align=right | 1.7 km || 
|-id=582 bgcolor=#E9E9E9
| 93582 ||  || — || October 24, 2000 || Socorro || LINEAR || — || align=right | 2.7 km || 
|-id=583 bgcolor=#d6d6d6
| 93583 ||  || — || October 24, 2000 || Socorro || LINEAR || — || align=right | 7.9 km || 
|-id=584 bgcolor=#E9E9E9
| 93584 ||  || — || October 24, 2000 || Socorro || LINEAR || — || align=right | 2.6 km || 
|-id=585 bgcolor=#d6d6d6
| 93585 ||  || — || October 24, 2000 || Socorro || LINEAR || — || align=right | 7.7 km || 
|-id=586 bgcolor=#E9E9E9
| 93586 ||  || — || October 24, 2000 || Socorro || LINEAR || MAR || align=right | 2.6 km || 
|-id=587 bgcolor=#E9E9E9
| 93587 ||  || — || October 24, 2000 || Socorro || LINEAR || — || align=right | 3.7 km || 
|-id=588 bgcolor=#E9E9E9
| 93588 ||  || — || October 24, 2000 || Socorro || LINEAR || — || align=right | 3.0 km || 
|-id=589 bgcolor=#E9E9E9
| 93589 ||  || — || October 24, 2000 || Socorro || LINEAR || PAD || align=right | 4.8 km || 
|-id=590 bgcolor=#E9E9E9
| 93590 ||  || — || October 24, 2000 || Socorro || LINEAR || — || align=right | 2.5 km || 
|-id=591 bgcolor=#E9E9E9
| 93591 ||  || — || October 24, 2000 || Socorro || LINEAR || — || align=right | 4.6 km || 
|-id=592 bgcolor=#E9E9E9
| 93592 ||  || — || October 24, 2000 || Socorro || LINEAR || — || align=right | 1.8 km || 
|-id=593 bgcolor=#E9E9E9
| 93593 ||  || — || October 24, 2000 || Socorro || LINEAR || — || align=right | 3.1 km || 
|-id=594 bgcolor=#E9E9E9
| 93594 ||  || — || October 24, 2000 || Socorro || LINEAR || EUN || align=right | 2.5 km || 
|-id=595 bgcolor=#E9E9E9
| 93595 ||  || — || October 24, 2000 || Socorro || LINEAR || — || align=right | 5.5 km || 
|-id=596 bgcolor=#E9E9E9
| 93596 ||  || — || October 24, 2000 || Socorro || LINEAR || — || align=right | 2.5 km || 
|-id=597 bgcolor=#E9E9E9
| 93597 ||  || — || October 24, 2000 || Socorro || LINEAR || — || align=right | 2.1 km || 
|-id=598 bgcolor=#E9E9E9
| 93598 ||  || — || October 24, 2000 || Socorro || LINEAR || — || align=right | 6.0 km || 
|-id=599 bgcolor=#E9E9E9
| 93599 ||  || — || October 25, 2000 || Socorro || LINEAR || — || align=right | 3.4 km || 
|-id=600 bgcolor=#E9E9E9
| 93600 ||  || — || October 25, 2000 || Socorro || LINEAR || — || align=right | 2.9 km || 
|}

93601–93700 

|-bgcolor=#E9E9E9
| 93601 ||  || — || October 25, 2000 || Socorro || LINEAR || — || align=right | 4.4 km || 
|-id=602 bgcolor=#fefefe
| 93602 ||  || — || October 25, 2000 || Socorro || LINEAR || — || align=right | 2.1 km || 
|-id=603 bgcolor=#E9E9E9
| 93603 ||  || — || October 25, 2000 || Socorro || LINEAR || — || align=right | 4.9 km || 
|-id=604 bgcolor=#E9E9E9
| 93604 ||  || — || October 25, 2000 || Socorro || LINEAR || — || align=right | 2.0 km || 
|-id=605 bgcolor=#E9E9E9
| 93605 ||  || — || October 25, 2000 || Socorro || LINEAR || MAR || align=right | 2.4 km || 
|-id=606 bgcolor=#E9E9E9
| 93606 ||  || — || October 25, 2000 || Socorro || LINEAR || GEF || align=right | 3.2 km || 
|-id=607 bgcolor=#E9E9E9
| 93607 ||  || — || October 25, 2000 || Socorro || LINEAR || — || align=right | 3.3 km || 
|-id=608 bgcolor=#E9E9E9
| 93608 ||  || — || October 25, 2000 || Socorro || LINEAR || — || align=right | 2.5 km || 
|-id=609 bgcolor=#fefefe
| 93609 ||  || — || October 25, 2000 || Socorro || LINEAR || — || align=right | 5.4 km || 
|-id=610 bgcolor=#fefefe
| 93610 ||  || — || October 25, 2000 || Socorro || LINEAR || SUL || align=right | 2.7 km || 
|-id=611 bgcolor=#E9E9E9
| 93611 ||  || — || October 25, 2000 || Socorro || LINEAR || — || align=right | 2.0 km || 
|-id=612 bgcolor=#E9E9E9
| 93612 ||  || — || October 25, 2000 || Socorro || LINEAR || — || align=right | 2.5 km || 
|-id=613 bgcolor=#E9E9E9
| 93613 ||  || — || October 25, 2000 || Socorro || LINEAR || — || align=right | 3.7 km || 
|-id=614 bgcolor=#E9E9E9
| 93614 ||  || — || October 25, 2000 || Socorro || LINEAR || HEN || align=right | 2.4 km || 
|-id=615 bgcolor=#E9E9E9
| 93615 ||  || — || October 25, 2000 || Socorro || LINEAR || — || align=right | 2.9 km || 
|-id=616 bgcolor=#E9E9E9
| 93616 ||  || — || October 25, 2000 || Socorro || LINEAR || — || align=right | 5.0 km || 
|-id=617 bgcolor=#E9E9E9
| 93617 ||  || — || October 25, 2000 || Socorro || LINEAR || PAD || align=right | 5.0 km || 
|-id=618 bgcolor=#E9E9E9
| 93618 ||  || — || October 25, 2000 || Socorro || LINEAR || — || align=right | 2.0 km || 
|-id=619 bgcolor=#E9E9E9
| 93619 ||  || — || October 25, 2000 || Socorro || LINEAR || — || align=right | 1.5 km || 
|-id=620 bgcolor=#E9E9E9
| 93620 ||  || — || October 25, 2000 || Socorro || LINEAR || — || align=right | 2.6 km || 
|-id=621 bgcolor=#E9E9E9
| 93621 ||  || — || October 25, 2000 || Socorro || LINEAR || — || align=right | 4.8 km || 
|-id=622 bgcolor=#E9E9E9
| 93622 ||  || — || October 25, 2000 || Socorro || LINEAR || — || align=right | 3.4 km || 
|-id=623 bgcolor=#E9E9E9
| 93623 ||  || — || October 25, 2000 || Socorro || LINEAR || — || align=right | 3.5 km || 
|-id=624 bgcolor=#E9E9E9
| 93624 ||  || — || October 26, 2000 || Socorro || LINEAR || — || align=right | 2.8 km || 
|-id=625 bgcolor=#E9E9E9
| 93625 ||  || — || October 26, 2000 || Socorro || LINEAR || — || align=right | 2.2 km || 
|-id=626 bgcolor=#E9E9E9
| 93626 ||  || — || October 26, 2000 || Socorro || LINEAR || — || align=right | 4.1 km || 
|-id=627 bgcolor=#E9E9E9
| 93627 ||  || — || October 29, 2000 || Socorro || LINEAR || — || align=right | 3.8 km || 
|-id=628 bgcolor=#E9E9E9
| 93628 ||  || — || October 31, 2000 || Socorro || LINEAR || — || align=right | 3.4 km || 
|-id=629 bgcolor=#E9E9E9
| 93629 ||  || — || October 24, 2000 || Socorro || LINEAR || — || align=right | 2.6 km || 
|-id=630 bgcolor=#E9E9E9
| 93630 ||  || — || October 24, 2000 || Socorro || LINEAR || WIT || align=right | 2.0 km || 
|-id=631 bgcolor=#d6d6d6
| 93631 ||  || — || October 24, 2000 || Socorro || LINEAR || EOS || align=right | 4.8 km || 
|-id=632 bgcolor=#d6d6d6
| 93632 ||  || — || October 24, 2000 || Socorro || LINEAR || KAR || align=right | 2.5 km || 
|-id=633 bgcolor=#E9E9E9
| 93633 ||  || — || October 24, 2000 || Socorro || LINEAR || — || align=right | 5.2 km || 
|-id=634 bgcolor=#E9E9E9
| 93634 ||  || — || October 24, 2000 || Socorro || LINEAR || HNS || align=right | 2.5 km || 
|-id=635 bgcolor=#E9E9E9
| 93635 ||  || — || October 24, 2000 || Socorro || LINEAR || PAD || align=right | 4.4 km || 
|-id=636 bgcolor=#E9E9E9
| 93636 ||  || — || October 24, 2000 || Socorro || LINEAR || — || align=right | 3.8 km || 
|-id=637 bgcolor=#E9E9E9
| 93637 ||  || — || October 24, 2000 || Socorro || LINEAR || — || align=right | 5.1 km || 
|-id=638 bgcolor=#E9E9E9
| 93638 ||  || — || October 24, 2000 || Socorro || LINEAR || — || align=right | 4.6 km || 
|-id=639 bgcolor=#E9E9E9
| 93639 ||  || — || October 31, 2000 || Socorro || LINEAR || — || align=right | 5.0 km || 
|-id=640 bgcolor=#E9E9E9
| 93640 ||  || — || October 31, 2000 || Socorro || LINEAR || — || align=right | 3.8 km || 
|-id=641 bgcolor=#E9E9E9
| 93641 ||  || — || October 31, 2000 || Socorro || LINEAR || — || align=right | 3.1 km || 
|-id=642 bgcolor=#E9E9E9
| 93642 ||  || — || October 31, 2000 || Socorro || LINEAR || AGN || align=right | 2.4 km || 
|-id=643 bgcolor=#E9E9E9
| 93643 ||  || — || October 31, 2000 || Socorro || LINEAR || — || align=right | 2.7 km || 
|-id=644 bgcolor=#E9E9E9
| 93644 ||  || — || October 24, 2000 || Socorro || LINEAR || — || align=right | 2.2 km || 
|-id=645 bgcolor=#E9E9E9
| 93645 ||  || — || October 24, 2000 || Socorro || LINEAR || — || align=right | 4.4 km || 
|-id=646 bgcolor=#E9E9E9
| 93646 ||  || — || October 24, 2000 || Socorro || LINEAR || — || align=right | 3.0 km || 
|-id=647 bgcolor=#fefefe
| 93647 ||  || — || October 25, 2000 || Socorro || LINEAR || — || align=right | 3.2 km || 
|-id=648 bgcolor=#E9E9E9
| 93648 ||  || — || October 25, 2000 || Socorro || LINEAR || — || align=right | 2.5 km || 
|-id=649 bgcolor=#E9E9E9
| 93649 ||  || — || October 25, 2000 || Socorro || LINEAR || — || align=right | 2.3 km || 
|-id=650 bgcolor=#E9E9E9
| 93650 ||  || — || October 25, 2000 || Socorro || LINEAR || RAF || align=right | 2.1 km || 
|-id=651 bgcolor=#E9E9E9
| 93651 ||  || — || October 25, 2000 || Socorro || LINEAR || KON || align=right | 4.8 km || 
|-id=652 bgcolor=#E9E9E9
| 93652 ||  || — || October 25, 2000 || Socorro || LINEAR || WIT || align=right | 1.9 km || 
|-id=653 bgcolor=#E9E9E9
| 93653 ||  || — || October 25, 2000 || Socorro || LINEAR || WIT || align=right | 2.8 km || 
|-id=654 bgcolor=#E9E9E9
| 93654 ||  || — || October 25, 2000 || Socorro || LINEAR || — || align=right | 5.0 km || 
|-id=655 bgcolor=#E9E9E9
| 93655 ||  || — || October 25, 2000 || Socorro || LINEAR || — || align=right | 5.3 km || 
|-id=656 bgcolor=#E9E9E9
| 93656 ||  || — || October 25, 2000 || Socorro || LINEAR || — || align=right | 2.1 km || 
|-id=657 bgcolor=#E9E9E9
| 93657 ||  || — || October 25, 2000 || Socorro || LINEAR || — || align=right | 3.8 km || 
|-id=658 bgcolor=#E9E9E9
| 93658 ||  || — || October 25, 2000 || Socorro || LINEAR || — || align=right | 3.3 km || 
|-id=659 bgcolor=#E9E9E9
| 93659 ||  || — || October 25, 2000 || Socorro || LINEAR || — || align=right | 3.8 km || 
|-id=660 bgcolor=#E9E9E9
| 93660 ||  || — || October 25, 2000 || Socorro || LINEAR || — || align=right | 3.8 km || 
|-id=661 bgcolor=#d6d6d6
| 93661 ||  || — || October 25, 2000 || Socorro || LINEAR || — || align=right | 4.2 km || 
|-id=662 bgcolor=#E9E9E9
| 93662 ||  || — || October 29, 2000 || Socorro || LINEAR || — || align=right | 2.2 km || 
|-id=663 bgcolor=#E9E9E9
| 93663 ||  || — || October 29, 2000 || Socorro || LINEAR || — || align=right | 2.4 km || 
|-id=664 bgcolor=#E9E9E9
| 93664 ||  || — || October 30, 2000 || Socorro || LINEAR || — || align=right | 4.3 km || 
|-id=665 bgcolor=#E9E9E9
| 93665 ||  || — || October 31, 2000 || Socorro || LINEAR || — || align=right | 3.0 km || 
|-id=666 bgcolor=#E9E9E9
| 93666 ||  || — || October 31, 2000 || Socorro || LINEAR || — || align=right | 3.5 km || 
|-id=667 bgcolor=#E9E9E9
| 93667 ||  || — || October 31, 2000 || Socorro || LINEAR || MIT || align=right | 5.9 km || 
|-id=668 bgcolor=#E9E9E9
| 93668 ||  || — || October 31, 2000 || Socorro || LINEAR || — || align=right | 12 km || 
|-id=669 bgcolor=#d6d6d6
| 93669 ||  || — || October 29, 2000 || Kitt Peak || Spacewatch || CHA || align=right | 3.7 km || 
|-id=670 bgcolor=#E9E9E9
| 93670 ||  || — || October 29, 2000 || Kitt Peak || Spacewatch || — || align=right | 2.6 km || 
|-id=671 bgcolor=#E9E9E9
| 93671 ||  || — || October 24, 2000 || Socorro || LINEAR || MIS || align=right | 4.1 km || 
|-id=672 bgcolor=#E9E9E9
| 93672 ||  || — || October 19, 2000 || Kitt Peak || Spacewatch || — || align=right | 3.4 km || 
|-id=673 bgcolor=#E9E9E9
| 93673 ||  || — || October 18, 2000 || Socorro || LINEAR || HNS || align=right | 3.4 km || 
|-id=674 bgcolor=#E9E9E9
| 93674 ||  || — || November 1, 2000 || Socorro || LINEAR || — || align=right | 2.1 km || 
|-id=675 bgcolor=#E9E9E9
| 93675 ||  || — || November 1, 2000 || Socorro || LINEAR || — || align=right | 5.6 km || 
|-id=676 bgcolor=#E9E9E9
| 93676 ||  || — || November 1, 2000 || Socorro || LINEAR || EUN || align=right | 2.5 km || 
|-id=677 bgcolor=#E9E9E9
| 93677 ||  || — || November 1, 2000 || Socorro || LINEAR || — || align=right | 2.0 km || 
|-id=678 bgcolor=#E9E9E9
| 93678 ||  || — || November 1, 2000 || Socorro || LINEAR || — || align=right | 3.3 km || 
|-id=679 bgcolor=#E9E9E9
| 93679 ||  || — || November 1, 2000 || Socorro || LINEAR || — || align=right | 6.5 km || 
|-id=680 bgcolor=#E9E9E9
| 93680 ||  || — || November 1, 2000 || Socorro || LINEAR || — || align=right | 3.1 km || 
|-id=681 bgcolor=#E9E9E9
| 93681 ||  || — || November 1, 2000 || Socorro || LINEAR || — || align=right | 2.3 km || 
|-id=682 bgcolor=#E9E9E9
| 93682 ||  || — || November 1, 2000 || Socorro || LINEAR || — || align=right | 2.4 km || 
|-id=683 bgcolor=#E9E9E9
| 93683 ||  || — || November 1, 2000 || Socorro || LINEAR || — || align=right | 3.3 km || 
|-id=684 bgcolor=#E9E9E9
| 93684 ||  || — || November 1, 2000 || Socorro || LINEAR || HEN || align=right | 2.6 km || 
|-id=685 bgcolor=#E9E9E9
| 93685 ||  || — || November 1, 2000 || Socorro || LINEAR || — || align=right | 3.2 km || 
|-id=686 bgcolor=#E9E9E9
| 93686 ||  || — || November 1, 2000 || Socorro || LINEAR || NEM || align=right | 4.2 km || 
|-id=687 bgcolor=#E9E9E9
| 93687 ||  || — || November 1, 2000 || Socorro || LINEAR || — || align=right | 3.2 km || 
|-id=688 bgcolor=#E9E9E9
| 93688 ||  || — || November 1, 2000 || Socorro || LINEAR || HOF || align=right | 5.9 km || 
|-id=689 bgcolor=#E9E9E9
| 93689 ||  || — || November 1, 2000 || Socorro || LINEAR || — || align=right | 3.3 km || 
|-id=690 bgcolor=#d6d6d6
| 93690 ||  || — || November 1, 2000 || Socorro || LINEAR || KAR || align=right | 2.2 km || 
|-id=691 bgcolor=#E9E9E9
| 93691 ||  || — || November 1, 2000 || Socorro || LINEAR || — || align=right | 3.7 km || 
|-id=692 bgcolor=#E9E9E9
| 93692 ||  || — || November 1, 2000 || Socorro || LINEAR || — || align=right | 3.0 km || 
|-id=693 bgcolor=#E9E9E9
| 93693 ||  || — || November 1, 2000 || Socorro || LINEAR || — || align=right | 4.5 km || 
|-id=694 bgcolor=#E9E9E9
| 93694 ||  || — || November 1, 2000 || Socorro || LINEAR || — || align=right | 2.5 km || 
|-id=695 bgcolor=#E9E9E9
| 93695 ||  || — || November 1, 2000 || Socorro || LINEAR || WAT || align=right | 4.7 km || 
|-id=696 bgcolor=#E9E9E9
| 93696 ||  || — || November 1, 2000 || Socorro || LINEAR || — || align=right | 4.4 km || 
|-id=697 bgcolor=#E9E9E9
| 93697 ||  || — || November 1, 2000 || Socorro || LINEAR || — || align=right | 2.5 km || 
|-id=698 bgcolor=#E9E9E9
| 93698 ||  || — || November 1, 2000 || Socorro || LINEAR || — || align=right | 3.6 km || 
|-id=699 bgcolor=#E9E9E9
| 93699 ||  || — || November 1, 2000 || Socorro || LINEAR || GEF || align=right | 3.4 km || 
|-id=700 bgcolor=#E9E9E9
| 93700 ||  || — || November 1, 2000 || Socorro || LINEAR || — || align=right | 3.8 km || 
|}

93701–93800 

|-bgcolor=#E9E9E9
| 93701 ||  || — || November 1, 2000 || Socorro || LINEAR || — || align=right | 2.4 km || 
|-id=702 bgcolor=#E9E9E9
| 93702 ||  || — || November 1, 2000 || Socorro || LINEAR || — || align=right | 2.2 km || 
|-id=703 bgcolor=#E9E9E9
| 93703 ||  || — || November 1, 2000 || Socorro || LINEAR || — || align=right | 2.3 km || 
|-id=704 bgcolor=#E9E9E9
| 93704 ||  || — || November 1, 2000 || Socorro || LINEAR || RAF || align=right | 2.3 km || 
|-id=705 bgcolor=#E9E9E9
| 93705 ||  || — || November 1, 2000 || Socorro || LINEAR || — || align=right | 2.9 km || 
|-id=706 bgcolor=#E9E9E9
| 93706 ||  || — || November 1, 2000 || Socorro || LINEAR || — || align=right | 3.1 km || 
|-id=707 bgcolor=#E9E9E9
| 93707 ||  || — || November 1, 2000 || Socorro || LINEAR || — || align=right | 2.3 km || 
|-id=708 bgcolor=#E9E9E9
| 93708 ||  || — || November 1, 2000 || Socorro || LINEAR || — || align=right | 3.4 km || 
|-id=709 bgcolor=#fefefe
| 93709 ||  || — || November 1, 2000 || Socorro || LINEAR || — || align=right | 2.3 km || 
|-id=710 bgcolor=#E9E9E9
| 93710 ||  || — || November 1, 2000 || Socorro || LINEAR || — || align=right | 3.4 km || 
|-id=711 bgcolor=#E9E9E9
| 93711 ||  || — || November 1, 2000 || Socorro || LINEAR || — || align=right | 5.4 km || 
|-id=712 bgcolor=#E9E9E9
| 93712 ||  || — || November 1, 2000 || Socorro || LINEAR || — || align=right | 4.2 km || 
|-id=713 bgcolor=#E9E9E9
| 93713 ||  || — || November 1, 2000 || Socorro || LINEAR || — || align=right | 4.0 km || 
|-id=714 bgcolor=#E9E9E9
| 93714 ||  || — || November 1, 2000 || Socorro || LINEAR || — || align=right | 3.2 km || 
|-id=715 bgcolor=#E9E9E9
| 93715 ||  || — || November 1, 2000 || Socorro || LINEAR || — || align=right | 3.1 km || 
|-id=716 bgcolor=#d6d6d6
| 93716 ||  || — || November 1, 2000 || Socorro || LINEAR || — || align=right | 6.5 km || 
|-id=717 bgcolor=#d6d6d6
| 93717 ||  || — || November 1, 2000 || Socorro || LINEAR || — || align=right | 9.2 km || 
|-id=718 bgcolor=#E9E9E9
| 93718 ||  || — || November 1, 2000 || Socorro || LINEAR || — || align=right | 3.9 km || 
|-id=719 bgcolor=#E9E9E9
| 93719 ||  || — || November 1, 2000 || Socorro || LINEAR || POS || align=right | 5.1 km || 
|-id=720 bgcolor=#E9E9E9
| 93720 ||  || — || November 1, 2000 || Socorro || LINEAR || — || align=right | 6.8 km || 
|-id=721 bgcolor=#E9E9E9
| 93721 ||  || — || November 1, 2000 || Socorro || LINEAR || — || align=right | 2.5 km || 
|-id=722 bgcolor=#E9E9E9
| 93722 ||  || — || November 1, 2000 || Socorro || LINEAR || — || align=right | 2.5 km || 
|-id=723 bgcolor=#E9E9E9
| 93723 ||  || — || November 1, 2000 || Socorro || LINEAR || — || align=right | 1.8 km || 
|-id=724 bgcolor=#E9E9E9
| 93724 ||  || — || November 1, 2000 || Socorro || LINEAR || — || align=right | 2.1 km || 
|-id=725 bgcolor=#E9E9E9
| 93725 ||  || — || November 1, 2000 || Socorro || LINEAR || — || align=right | 2.8 km || 
|-id=726 bgcolor=#E9E9E9
| 93726 ||  || — || November 1, 2000 || Socorro || LINEAR || — || align=right | 3.5 km || 
|-id=727 bgcolor=#fefefe
| 93727 ||  || — || November 1, 2000 || Socorro || LINEAR || NYS || align=right | 1.7 km || 
|-id=728 bgcolor=#E9E9E9
| 93728 ||  || — || November 1, 2000 || Socorro || LINEAR || — || align=right | 3.1 km || 
|-id=729 bgcolor=#E9E9E9
| 93729 ||  || — || November 2, 2000 || Socorro || LINEAR || EUN || align=right | 2.1 km || 
|-id=730 bgcolor=#E9E9E9
| 93730 ||  || — || November 2, 2000 || Socorro || LINEAR || — || align=right | 3.9 km || 
|-id=731 bgcolor=#d6d6d6
| 93731 ||  || — || November 3, 2000 || Socorro || LINEAR || EOS || align=right | 3.6 km || 
|-id=732 bgcolor=#d6d6d6
| 93732 ||  || — || November 3, 2000 || Socorro || LINEAR || — || align=right | 7.1 km || 
|-id=733 bgcolor=#d6d6d6
| 93733 ||  || — || November 3, 2000 || Socorro || LINEAR || — || align=right | 9.6 km || 
|-id=734 bgcolor=#E9E9E9
| 93734 ||  || — || November 1, 2000 || Socorro || LINEAR || AST || align=right | 3.5 km || 
|-id=735 bgcolor=#E9E9E9
| 93735 ||  || — || November 2, 2000 || Socorro || LINEAR || — || align=right | 3.3 km || 
|-id=736 bgcolor=#E9E9E9
| 93736 ||  || — || November 2, 2000 || Socorro || LINEAR || — || align=right | 3.7 km || 
|-id=737 bgcolor=#E9E9E9
| 93737 ||  || — || November 2, 2000 || Socorro || LINEAR || ADE || align=right | 6.4 km || 
|-id=738 bgcolor=#E9E9E9
| 93738 ||  || — || November 2, 2000 || Socorro || LINEAR || slow || align=right | 4.3 km || 
|-id=739 bgcolor=#E9E9E9
| 93739 ||  || — || November 3, 2000 || Socorro || LINEAR || — || align=right | 2.9 km || 
|-id=740 bgcolor=#E9E9E9
| 93740 ||  || — || November 3, 2000 || Socorro || LINEAR || — || align=right | 3.0 km || 
|-id=741 bgcolor=#E9E9E9
| 93741 ||  || — || November 3, 2000 || Socorro || LINEAR || — || align=right | 4.4 km || 
|-id=742 bgcolor=#E9E9E9
| 93742 ||  || — || November 3, 2000 || Socorro || LINEAR || — || align=right | 3.7 km || 
|-id=743 bgcolor=#E9E9E9
| 93743 ||  || — || November 3, 2000 || Socorro || LINEAR || — || align=right | 4.6 km || 
|-id=744 bgcolor=#E9E9E9
| 93744 ||  || — || November 3, 2000 || Socorro || LINEAR || EUN || align=right | 2.8 km || 
|-id=745 bgcolor=#E9E9E9
| 93745 ||  || — || November 3, 2000 || Socorro || LINEAR || — || align=right | 4.6 km || 
|-id=746 bgcolor=#E9E9E9
| 93746 ||  || — || November 3, 2000 || Socorro || LINEAR || — || align=right | 2.7 km || 
|-id=747 bgcolor=#E9E9E9
| 93747 ||  || — || November 3, 2000 || Socorro || LINEAR || — || align=right | 2.2 km || 
|-id=748 bgcolor=#E9E9E9
| 93748 ||  || — || November 9, 2000 || Socorro || LINEAR || — || align=right | 3.5 km || 
|-id=749 bgcolor=#E9E9E9
| 93749 ||  || — || November 2, 2000 || Socorro || LINEAR || — || align=right | 3.0 km || 
|-id=750 bgcolor=#fefefe
| 93750 ||  || — || November 17, 2000 || Socorro || LINEAR || CHL || align=right | 6.2 km || 
|-id=751 bgcolor=#FA8072
| 93751 ||  || — || November 17, 2000 || Socorro || LINEAR || — || align=right | 2.8 km || 
|-id=752 bgcolor=#E9E9E9
| 93752 ||  || — || November 19, 2000 || Socorro || LINEAR || — || align=right | 3.3 km || 
|-id=753 bgcolor=#E9E9E9
| 93753 ||  || — || November 19, 2000 || Socorro || LINEAR || — || align=right | 2.3 km || 
|-id=754 bgcolor=#d6d6d6
| 93754 ||  || — || November 19, 2000 || Socorro || LINEAR || EOS || align=right | 5.2 km || 
|-id=755 bgcolor=#d6d6d6
| 93755 ||  || — || November 19, 2000 || Socorro || LINEAR || — || align=right | 9.2 km || 
|-id=756 bgcolor=#E9E9E9
| 93756 ||  || — || November 19, 2000 || Desert Beaver || W. K. Y. Yeung || slow || align=right | 3.3 km || 
|-id=757 bgcolor=#d6d6d6
| 93757 ||  || — || November 20, 2000 || Socorro || LINEAR || LIX || align=right | 7.7 km || 
|-id=758 bgcolor=#E9E9E9
| 93758 ||  || — || November 21, 2000 || Socorro || LINEAR || — || align=right | 2.9 km || 
|-id=759 bgcolor=#d6d6d6
| 93759 ||  || — || November 21, 2000 || Socorro || LINEAR || KOR || align=right | 2.8 km || 
|-id=760 bgcolor=#d6d6d6
| 93760 ||  || — || November 21, 2000 || Socorro || LINEAR || KOR || align=right | 3.2 km || 
|-id=761 bgcolor=#d6d6d6
| 93761 ||  || — || November 21, 2000 || Socorro || LINEAR || — || align=right | 5.1 km || 
|-id=762 bgcolor=#E9E9E9
| 93762 ||  || — || November 21, 2000 || Socorro || LINEAR || RAF || align=right | 1.7 km || 
|-id=763 bgcolor=#E9E9E9
| 93763 ||  || — || November 25, 2000 || Fountain Hills || C. W. Juels || — || align=right | 2.6 km || 
|-id=764 bgcolor=#d6d6d6
| 93764 ||  || — || November 23, 2000 || Kitt Peak || Spacewatch || — || align=right | 5.9 km || 
|-id=765 bgcolor=#E9E9E9
| 93765 ||  || — || November 25, 2000 || Kitt Peak || Spacewatch || MRX || align=right | 2.7 km || 
|-id=766 bgcolor=#E9E9E9
| 93766 ||  || — || November 25, 2000 || Socorro || LINEAR || HNS || align=right | 2.5 km || 
|-id=767 bgcolor=#d6d6d6
| 93767 ||  || — || November 21, 2000 || Needville || Needville Obs. || — || align=right | 6.3 km || 
|-id=768 bgcolor=#FA8072
| 93768 ||  || — || November 20, 2000 || Socorro || LINEAR || — || align=right | 3.1 km || 
|-id=769 bgcolor=#E9E9E9
| 93769 ||  || — || November 20, 2000 || Socorro || LINEAR || — || align=right | 2.3 km || 
|-id=770 bgcolor=#E9E9E9
| 93770 ||  || — || November 20, 2000 || Socorro || LINEAR || AGN || align=right | 2.3 km || 
|-id=771 bgcolor=#E9E9E9
| 93771 ||  || — || November 20, 2000 || Socorro || LINEAR || ADE || align=right | 4.9 km || 
|-id=772 bgcolor=#E9E9E9
| 93772 ||  || — || November 21, 2000 || Socorro || LINEAR || — || align=right | 5.8 km || 
|-id=773 bgcolor=#E9E9E9
| 93773 ||  || — || November 21, 2000 || Socorro || LINEAR || PAD || align=right | 4.5 km || 
|-id=774 bgcolor=#d6d6d6
| 93774 ||  || — || November 21, 2000 || Socorro || LINEAR || KOR || align=right | 3.0 km || 
|-id=775 bgcolor=#E9E9E9
| 93775 ||  || — || November 21, 2000 || Socorro || LINEAR || — || align=right | 2.5 km || 
|-id=776 bgcolor=#E9E9E9
| 93776 ||  || — || November 25, 2000 || Socorro || LINEAR || INO || align=right | 3.1 km || 
|-id=777 bgcolor=#E9E9E9
| 93777 ||  || — || November 20, 2000 || Socorro || LINEAR || WIT || align=right | 1.8 km || 
|-id=778 bgcolor=#E9E9E9
| 93778 ||  || — || November 20, 2000 || Socorro || LINEAR || — || align=right | 2.8 km || 
|-id=779 bgcolor=#E9E9E9
| 93779 ||  || — || November 20, 2000 || Socorro || LINEAR || — || align=right | 5.7 km || 
|-id=780 bgcolor=#E9E9E9
| 93780 ||  || — || November 20, 2000 || Socorro || LINEAR || — || align=right | 2.6 km || 
|-id=781 bgcolor=#d6d6d6
| 93781 ||  || — || November 20, 2000 || Socorro || LINEAR || EOS || align=right | 4.5 km || 
|-id=782 bgcolor=#E9E9E9
| 93782 ||  || — || November 20, 2000 || Socorro || LINEAR || — || align=right | 3.4 km || 
|-id=783 bgcolor=#E9E9E9
| 93783 ||  || — || November 20, 2000 || Socorro || LINEAR || — || align=right | 2.2 km || 
|-id=784 bgcolor=#E9E9E9
| 93784 ||  || — || November 20, 2000 || Socorro || LINEAR || — || align=right | 4.7 km || 
|-id=785 bgcolor=#E9E9E9
| 93785 ||  || — || November 20, 2000 || Socorro || LINEAR || — || align=right | 2.4 km || 
|-id=786 bgcolor=#E9E9E9
| 93786 ||  || — || November 20, 2000 || Socorro || LINEAR || NEM || align=right | 4.7 km || 
|-id=787 bgcolor=#d6d6d6
| 93787 ||  || — || November 20, 2000 || Socorro || LINEAR || EOS || align=right | 3.9 km || 
|-id=788 bgcolor=#E9E9E9
| 93788 ||  || — || November 20, 2000 || Socorro || LINEAR || — || align=right | 3.4 km || 
|-id=789 bgcolor=#E9E9E9
| 93789 ||  || — || November 20, 2000 || Socorro || LINEAR || — || align=right | 3.7 km || 
|-id=790 bgcolor=#E9E9E9
| 93790 ||  || — || November 20, 2000 || Socorro || LINEAR || — || align=right | 3.3 km || 
|-id=791 bgcolor=#d6d6d6
| 93791 ||  || — || November 20, 2000 || Socorro || LINEAR || EOS || align=right | 4.0 km || 
|-id=792 bgcolor=#E9E9E9
| 93792 ||  || — || November 20, 2000 || Socorro || LINEAR || — || align=right | 4.8 km || 
|-id=793 bgcolor=#E9E9E9
| 93793 ||  || — || November 20, 2000 || Socorro || LINEAR || ADE || align=right | 6.1 km || 
|-id=794 bgcolor=#E9E9E9
| 93794 ||  || — || November 21, 2000 || Socorro || LINEAR || AGN || align=right | 2.5 km || 
|-id=795 bgcolor=#E9E9E9
| 93795 ||  || — || November 21, 2000 || Socorro || LINEAR || — || align=right | 3.4 km || 
|-id=796 bgcolor=#d6d6d6
| 93796 ||  || — || November 21, 2000 || Socorro || LINEAR || EOS || align=right | 4.2 km || 
|-id=797 bgcolor=#E9E9E9
| 93797 ||  || — || November 21, 2000 || Socorro || LINEAR || MAR || align=right | 2.5 km || 
|-id=798 bgcolor=#E9E9E9
| 93798 ||  || — || November 21, 2000 || Socorro || LINEAR || — || align=right | 4.8 km || 
|-id=799 bgcolor=#E9E9E9
| 93799 ||  || — || November 21, 2000 || Socorro || LINEAR || — || align=right | 2.3 km || 
|-id=800 bgcolor=#E9E9E9
| 93800 ||  || — || November 21, 2000 || Socorro || LINEAR || GEF || align=right | 2.1 km || 
|}

93801–93900 

|-bgcolor=#E9E9E9
| 93801 ||  || — || November 21, 2000 || Socorro || LINEAR || — || align=right | 2.6 km || 
|-id=802 bgcolor=#d6d6d6
| 93802 ||  || — || November 21, 2000 || Socorro || LINEAR || — || align=right | 9.9 km || 
|-id=803 bgcolor=#E9E9E9
| 93803 ||  || — || November 21, 2000 || Socorro || LINEAR || MIT || align=right | 7.5 km || 
|-id=804 bgcolor=#E9E9E9
| 93804 ||  || — || November 25, 2000 || Socorro || LINEAR || — || align=right | 4.1 km || 
|-id=805 bgcolor=#d6d6d6
| 93805 ||  || — || November 26, 2000 || Desert Beaver || W. K. Y. Yeung || KOR || align=right | 2.9 km || 
|-id=806 bgcolor=#E9E9E9
| 93806 ||  || — || November 20, 2000 || Socorro || LINEAR || — || align=right | 2.0 km || 
|-id=807 bgcolor=#E9E9E9
| 93807 ||  || — || November 20, 2000 || Socorro || LINEAR || — || align=right | 2.7 km || 
|-id=808 bgcolor=#d6d6d6
| 93808 ||  || — || November 20, 2000 || Socorro || LINEAR || EOS || align=right | 4.0 km || 
|-id=809 bgcolor=#E9E9E9
| 93809 ||  || — || November 21, 2000 || Socorro || LINEAR || MAR || align=right | 2.3 km || 
|-id=810 bgcolor=#E9E9E9
| 93810 ||  || — || November 21, 2000 || Socorro || LINEAR || — || align=right | 4.8 km || 
|-id=811 bgcolor=#E9E9E9
| 93811 ||  || — || November 21, 2000 || Socorro || LINEAR || — || align=right | 2.4 km || 
|-id=812 bgcolor=#E9E9E9
| 93812 ||  || — || November 21, 2000 || Socorro || LINEAR || — || align=right | 5.2 km || 
|-id=813 bgcolor=#E9E9E9
| 93813 ||  || — || November 21, 2000 || Socorro || LINEAR || EUN || align=right | 3.0 km || 
|-id=814 bgcolor=#d6d6d6
| 93814 ||  || — || November 21, 2000 || Socorro || LINEAR || EOS || align=right | 5.9 km || 
|-id=815 bgcolor=#E9E9E9
| 93815 ||  || — || November 21, 2000 || Socorro || LINEAR || — || align=right | 3.0 km || 
|-id=816 bgcolor=#E9E9E9
| 93816 ||  || — || November 21, 2000 || Socorro || LINEAR || — || align=right | 3.3 km || 
|-id=817 bgcolor=#d6d6d6
| 93817 ||  || — || November 21, 2000 || Socorro || LINEAR || — || align=right | 9.2 km || 
|-id=818 bgcolor=#E9E9E9
| 93818 ||  || — || November 23, 2000 || Haleakala || NEAT || — || align=right | 2.6 km || 
|-id=819 bgcolor=#E9E9E9
| 93819 ||  || — || November 19, 2000 || Socorro || LINEAR || — || align=right | 2.7 km || 
|-id=820 bgcolor=#E9E9E9
| 93820 ||  || — || November 19, 2000 || Socorro || LINEAR || EUN || align=right | 3.0 km || 
|-id=821 bgcolor=#E9E9E9
| 93821 ||  || — || November 19, 2000 || Socorro || LINEAR || — || align=right | 4.2 km || 
|-id=822 bgcolor=#E9E9E9
| 93822 ||  || — || November 19, 2000 || Socorro || LINEAR || — || align=right | 4.2 km || 
|-id=823 bgcolor=#E9E9E9
| 93823 ||  || — || November 20, 2000 || Socorro || LINEAR || HOF || align=right | 5.4 km || 
|-id=824 bgcolor=#E9E9E9
| 93824 ||  || — || November 20, 2000 || Socorro || LINEAR || — || align=right | 2.9 km || 
|-id=825 bgcolor=#d6d6d6
| 93825 ||  || — || November 20, 2000 || Socorro || LINEAR || 628 || align=right | 4.5 km || 
|-id=826 bgcolor=#d6d6d6
| 93826 ||  || — || November 20, 2000 || Socorro || LINEAR || CHA || align=right | 4.7 km || 
|-id=827 bgcolor=#E9E9E9
| 93827 ||  || — || November 20, 2000 || Socorro || LINEAR || — || align=right | 3.8 km || 
|-id=828 bgcolor=#E9E9E9
| 93828 ||  || — || November 20, 2000 || Socorro || LINEAR || — || align=right | 2.2 km || 
|-id=829 bgcolor=#d6d6d6
| 93829 ||  || — || November 20, 2000 || Socorro || LINEAR || — || align=right | 5.9 km || 
|-id=830 bgcolor=#E9E9E9
| 93830 ||  || — || November 20, 2000 || Socorro || LINEAR || — || align=right | 3.2 km || 
|-id=831 bgcolor=#E9E9E9
| 93831 ||  || — || November 20, 2000 || Socorro || LINEAR || — || align=right | 4.8 km || 
|-id=832 bgcolor=#d6d6d6
| 93832 ||  || — || November 20, 2000 || Socorro || LINEAR || — || align=right | 7.2 km || 
|-id=833 bgcolor=#E9E9E9
| 93833 ||  || — || November 20, 2000 || Socorro || LINEAR || HOF || align=right | 5.9 km || 
|-id=834 bgcolor=#E9E9E9
| 93834 ||  || — || November 20, 2000 || Socorro || LINEAR || HEN || align=right | 2.4 km || 
|-id=835 bgcolor=#E9E9E9
| 93835 ||  || — || November 20, 2000 || Socorro || LINEAR || — || align=right | 2.6 km || 
|-id=836 bgcolor=#E9E9E9
| 93836 ||  || — || November 20, 2000 || Socorro || LINEAR || — || align=right | 5.4 km || 
|-id=837 bgcolor=#E9E9E9
| 93837 ||  || — || November 20, 2000 || Socorro || LINEAR || — || align=right | 2.4 km || 
|-id=838 bgcolor=#E9E9E9
| 93838 ||  || — || November 20, 2000 || Socorro || LINEAR || — || align=right | 3.1 km || 
|-id=839 bgcolor=#E9E9E9
| 93839 ||  || — || November 20, 2000 || Socorro || LINEAR || — || align=right | 4.6 km || 
|-id=840 bgcolor=#d6d6d6
| 93840 ||  || — || November 20, 2000 || Socorro || LINEAR || K-2 || align=right | 2.4 km || 
|-id=841 bgcolor=#d6d6d6
| 93841 ||  || — || November 20, 2000 || Socorro || LINEAR || — || align=right | 8.0 km || 
|-id=842 bgcolor=#E9E9E9
| 93842 ||  || — || November 20, 2000 || Socorro || LINEAR || — || align=right | 3.1 km || 
|-id=843 bgcolor=#d6d6d6
| 93843 ||  || — || November 21, 2000 || Socorro || LINEAR || KOR || align=right | 3.3 km || 
|-id=844 bgcolor=#d6d6d6
| 93844 ||  || — || November 21, 2000 || Socorro || LINEAR || KOR || align=right | 3.1 km || 
|-id=845 bgcolor=#E9E9E9
| 93845 ||  || — || November 21, 2000 || Socorro || LINEAR || — || align=right | 4.7 km || 
|-id=846 bgcolor=#E9E9E9
| 93846 ||  || — || November 21, 2000 || Socorro || LINEAR || HEN || align=right | 5.0 km || 
|-id=847 bgcolor=#E9E9E9
| 93847 ||  || — || November 21, 2000 || Socorro || LINEAR || — || align=right | 2.4 km || 
|-id=848 bgcolor=#E9E9E9
| 93848 ||  || — || November 21, 2000 || Socorro || LINEAR || — || align=right | 4.7 km || 
|-id=849 bgcolor=#E9E9E9
| 93849 ||  || — || November 21, 2000 || Socorro || LINEAR || — || align=right | 2.7 km || 
|-id=850 bgcolor=#E9E9E9
| 93850 ||  || — || November 21, 2000 || Socorro || LINEAR || HEN || align=right | 2.4 km || 
|-id=851 bgcolor=#d6d6d6
| 93851 ||  || — || November 21, 2000 || Socorro || LINEAR || EOS || align=right | 4.8 km || 
|-id=852 bgcolor=#E9E9E9
| 93852 ||  || — || November 21, 2000 || Socorro || LINEAR || — || align=right | 4.4 km || 
|-id=853 bgcolor=#E9E9E9
| 93853 ||  || — || November 21, 2000 || Socorro || LINEAR || — || align=right | 5.7 km || 
|-id=854 bgcolor=#d6d6d6
| 93854 ||  || — || November 21, 2000 || Socorro || LINEAR || EOS || align=right | 5.5 km || 
|-id=855 bgcolor=#E9E9E9
| 93855 ||  || — || November 21, 2000 || Socorro || LINEAR || — || align=right | 3.6 km || 
|-id=856 bgcolor=#d6d6d6
| 93856 ||  || — || November 21, 2000 || Socorro || LINEAR || THM || align=right | 4.8 km || 
|-id=857 bgcolor=#E9E9E9
| 93857 ||  || — || November 26, 2000 || Socorro || LINEAR || — || align=right | 3.0 km || 
|-id=858 bgcolor=#E9E9E9
| 93858 ||  || — || November 26, 2000 || Socorro || LINEAR || ADE || align=right | 6.8 km || 
|-id=859 bgcolor=#E9E9E9
| 93859 ||  || — || November 20, 2000 || Socorro || LINEAR || MAR || align=right | 3.3 km || 
|-id=860 bgcolor=#E9E9E9
| 93860 ||  || — || November 20, 2000 || Socorro || LINEAR || EUN || align=right | 3.8 km || 
|-id=861 bgcolor=#d6d6d6
| 93861 ||  || — || November 20, 2000 || Socorro || LINEAR || EOS || align=right | 4.5 km || 
|-id=862 bgcolor=#E9E9E9
| 93862 ||  || — || November 20, 2000 || Socorro || LINEAR || — || align=right | 4.3 km || 
|-id=863 bgcolor=#d6d6d6
| 93863 ||  || — || November 20, 2000 || Socorro || LINEAR || — || align=right | 6.8 km || 
|-id=864 bgcolor=#d6d6d6
| 93864 ||  || — || November 20, 2000 || Socorro || LINEAR || EOS || align=right | 3.7 km || 
|-id=865 bgcolor=#d6d6d6
| 93865 ||  || — || November 20, 2000 || Socorro || LINEAR || CHA || align=right | 4.3 km || 
|-id=866 bgcolor=#d6d6d6
| 93866 ||  || — || November 20, 2000 || Socorro || LINEAR || — || align=right | 4.9 km || 
|-id=867 bgcolor=#E9E9E9
| 93867 ||  || — || November 20, 2000 || Socorro || LINEAR || MAR || align=right | 3.7 km || 
|-id=868 bgcolor=#E9E9E9
| 93868 ||  || — || November 20, 2000 || Socorro || LINEAR || — || align=right | 5.1 km || 
|-id=869 bgcolor=#E9E9E9
| 93869 ||  || — || November 20, 2000 || Socorro || LINEAR || — || align=right | 4.5 km || 
|-id=870 bgcolor=#E9E9E9
| 93870 ||  || — || November 20, 2000 || Socorro || LINEAR || — || align=right | 3.7 km || 
|-id=871 bgcolor=#E9E9E9
| 93871 ||  || — || November 20, 2000 || Socorro || LINEAR || — || align=right | 3.5 km || 
|-id=872 bgcolor=#E9E9E9
| 93872 ||  || — || November 29, 2000 || Socorro || LINEAR || — || align=right | 3.2 km || 
|-id=873 bgcolor=#E9E9E9
| 93873 ||  || — || November 29, 2000 || Socorro || LINEAR || HOF || align=right | 5.1 km || 
|-id=874 bgcolor=#E9E9E9
| 93874 ||  || — || November 27, 2000 || Haleakala || NEAT || — || align=right | 3.7 km || 
|-id=875 bgcolor=#E9E9E9
| 93875 ||  || — || November 30, 2000 || Socorro || LINEAR || — || align=right | 3.3 km || 
|-id=876 bgcolor=#E9E9E9
| 93876 ||  || — || November 30, 2000 || Socorro || LINEAR || — || align=right | 2.1 km || 
|-id=877 bgcolor=#E9E9E9
| 93877 ||  || — || November 17, 2000 || Kitt Peak || Spacewatch || — || align=right | 2.2 km || 
|-id=878 bgcolor=#E9E9E9
| 93878 ||  || — || November 18, 2000 || Kitt Peak || Spacewatch || NEM || align=right | 3.8 km || 
|-id=879 bgcolor=#d6d6d6
| 93879 ||  || — || November 18, 2000 || Kitt Peak || Spacewatch || KOR || align=right | 2.8 km || 
|-id=880 bgcolor=#E9E9E9
| 93880 ||  || — || November 19, 2000 || Kitt Peak || Spacewatch || HOF || align=right | 4.3 km || 
|-id=881 bgcolor=#d6d6d6
| 93881 ||  || — || November 19, 2000 || Kitt Peak || Spacewatch || KOR || align=right | 2.5 km || 
|-id=882 bgcolor=#E9E9E9
| 93882 ||  || — || November 19, 2000 || Desert Beaver || W. K. Y. Yeung || — || align=right | 8.4 km || 
|-id=883 bgcolor=#E9E9E9
| 93883 ||  || — || November 20, 2000 || Anderson Mesa || LONEOS || EUN || align=right | 2.6 km || 
|-id=884 bgcolor=#E9E9E9
| 93884 ||  || — || November 20, 2000 || Anderson Mesa || LONEOS || — || align=right | 4.3 km || 
|-id=885 bgcolor=#E9E9E9
| 93885 ||  || — || November 19, 2000 || Socorro || LINEAR || MAR || align=right | 3.2 km || 
|-id=886 bgcolor=#E9E9E9
| 93886 ||  || — || November 19, 2000 || Socorro || LINEAR || — || align=right | 2.8 km || 
|-id=887 bgcolor=#E9E9E9
| 93887 ||  || — || November 20, 2000 || Socorro || LINEAR || — || align=right | 2.1 km || 
|-id=888 bgcolor=#E9E9E9
| 93888 ||  || — || November 20, 2000 || Socorro || LINEAR || — || align=right | 2.9 km || 
|-id=889 bgcolor=#E9E9E9
| 93889 ||  || — || November 20, 2000 || Socorro || LINEAR || — || align=right | 2.4 km || 
|-id=890 bgcolor=#E9E9E9
| 93890 ||  || — || November 20, 2000 || Socorro || LINEAR || — || align=right | 3.4 km || 
|-id=891 bgcolor=#E9E9E9
| 93891 ||  || — || November 20, 2000 || Anderson Mesa || LONEOS || — || align=right | 3.1 km || 
|-id=892 bgcolor=#d6d6d6
| 93892 ||  || — || November 19, 2000 || Socorro || LINEAR || — || align=right | 8.2 km || 
|-id=893 bgcolor=#d6d6d6
| 93893 ||  || — || November 19, 2000 || Socorro || LINEAR || — || align=right | 4.5 km || 
|-id=894 bgcolor=#E9E9E9
| 93894 ||  || — || November 19, 2000 || Socorro || LINEAR || slow || align=right | 6.5 km || 
|-id=895 bgcolor=#E9E9E9
| 93895 ||  || — || November 20, 2000 || Anderson Mesa || LONEOS || — || align=right | 3.8 km || 
|-id=896 bgcolor=#E9E9E9
| 93896 ||  || — || November 20, 2000 || Anderson Mesa || LONEOS || ADE || align=right | 4.2 km || 
|-id=897 bgcolor=#E9E9E9
| 93897 ||  || — || November 20, 2000 || Anderson Mesa || LONEOS || EUN || align=right | 2.8 km || 
|-id=898 bgcolor=#E9E9E9
| 93898 ||  || — || November 20, 2000 || Socorro || LINEAR || — || align=right | 2.8 km || 
|-id=899 bgcolor=#E9E9E9
| 93899 ||  || — || November 22, 2000 || Haleakala || NEAT || — || align=right | 2.1 km || 
|-id=900 bgcolor=#E9E9E9
| 93900 ||  || — || November 24, 2000 || Anderson Mesa || LONEOS || — || align=right | 2.7 km || 
|}

93901–94000 

|-bgcolor=#E9E9E9
| 93901 ||  || — || November 28, 2000 || Kitt Peak || Spacewatch || — || align=right | 4.8 km || 
|-id=902 bgcolor=#E9E9E9
| 93902 ||  || — || November 28, 2000 || Haleakala || NEAT || — || align=right | 3.3 km || 
|-id=903 bgcolor=#E9E9E9
| 93903 ||  || — || November 28, 2000 || Kitt Peak || Spacewatch || — || align=right | 5.0 km || 
|-id=904 bgcolor=#E9E9E9
| 93904 ||  || — || November 19, 2000 || Socorro || LINEAR || HNS || align=right | 2.7 km || 
|-id=905 bgcolor=#E9E9E9
| 93905 ||  || — || November 29, 2000 || Haleakala || NEAT || EUN || align=right | 2.3 km || 
|-id=906 bgcolor=#d6d6d6
| 93906 ||  || — || November 29, 2000 || Socorro || LINEAR || — || align=right | 7.4 km || 
|-id=907 bgcolor=#fefefe
| 93907 ||  || — || November 30, 2000 || Socorro || LINEAR || LCI || align=right | 3.2 km || 
|-id=908 bgcolor=#E9E9E9
| 93908 ||  || — || November 30, 2000 || Socorro || LINEAR || GEF || align=right | 2.2 km || 
|-id=909 bgcolor=#E9E9E9
| 93909 ||  || — || November 30, 2000 || Socorro || LINEAR || — || align=right | 3.7 km || 
|-id=910 bgcolor=#E9E9E9
| 93910 ||  || — || November 30, 2000 || Socorro || LINEAR || ADE || align=right | 7.5 km || 
|-id=911 bgcolor=#d6d6d6
| 93911 ||  || — || November 30, 2000 || Socorro || LINEAR || — || align=right | 5.5 km || 
|-id=912 bgcolor=#E9E9E9
| 93912 ||  || — || November 30, 2000 || Socorro || LINEAR || — || align=right | 2.2 km || 
|-id=913 bgcolor=#E9E9E9
| 93913 ||  || — || November 30, 2000 || Socorro || LINEAR || GEF || align=right | 3.8 km || 
|-id=914 bgcolor=#E9E9E9
| 93914 ||  || — || November 30, 2000 || Socorro || LINEAR || — || align=right | 5.0 km || 
|-id=915 bgcolor=#d6d6d6
| 93915 ||  || — || November 30, 2000 || Socorro || LINEAR || — || align=right | 10 km || 
|-id=916 bgcolor=#E9E9E9
| 93916 ||  || — || November 30, 2000 || Socorro || LINEAR || — || align=right | 3.4 km || 
|-id=917 bgcolor=#E9E9E9
| 93917 ||  || — || November 30, 2000 || Haleakala || NEAT || — || align=right | 6.1 km || 
|-id=918 bgcolor=#E9E9E9
| 93918 ||  || — || November 20, 2000 || Anderson Mesa || LONEOS || — || align=right | 5.4 km || 
|-id=919 bgcolor=#E9E9E9
| 93919 ||  || — || November 20, 2000 || Anderson Mesa || LONEOS || — || align=right | 4.6 km || 
|-id=920 bgcolor=#E9E9E9
| 93920 ||  || — || November 20, 2000 || Socorro || LINEAR || PAD || align=right | 4.5 km || 
|-id=921 bgcolor=#E9E9E9
| 93921 ||  || — || November 20, 2000 || Socorro || LINEAR || EUN || align=right | 2.7 km || 
|-id=922 bgcolor=#E9E9E9
| 93922 ||  || — || November 20, 2000 || Anderson Mesa || LONEOS || — || align=right | 3.9 km || 
|-id=923 bgcolor=#E9E9E9
| 93923 ||  || — || November 20, 2000 || Anderson Mesa || LONEOS || — || align=right | 3.1 km || 
|-id=924 bgcolor=#E9E9E9
| 93924 ||  || — || November 20, 2000 || Anderson Mesa || LONEOS || EUN || align=right | 2.7 km || 
|-id=925 bgcolor=#E9E9E9
| 93925 ||  || — || November 20, 2000 || Anderson Mesa || LONEOS || — || align=right | 2.8 km || 
|-id=926 bgcolor=#E9E9E9
| 93926 ||  || — || November 20, 2000 || Anderson Mesa || LONEOS || MAR || align=right | 3.1 km || 
|-id=927 bgcolor=#E9E9E9
| 93927 ||  || — || November 20, 2000 || Anderson Mesa || LONEOS || GEF || align=right | 3.9 km || 
|-id=928 bgcolor=#d6d6d6
| 93928 ||  || — || November 20, 2000 || Anderson Mesa || LONEOS || KOR || align=right | 2.6 km || 
|-id=929 bgcolor=#E9E9E9
| 93929 ||  || — || November 21, 2000 || Socorro || LINEAR || GEF || align=right | 2.9 km || 
|-id=930 bgcolor=#E9E9E9
| 93930 ||  || — || November 21, 2000 || Socorro || LINEAR || — || align=right | 5.0 km || 
|-id=931 bgcolor=#E9E9E9
| 93931 ||  || — || November 22, 2000 || Haleakala || NEAT || — || align=right | 2.7 km || 
|-id=932 bgcolor=#E9E9E9
| 93932 ||  || — || November 23, 2000 || Haleakala || NEAT || MAR || align=right | 2.6 km || 
|-id=933 bgcolor=#E9E9E9
| 93933 ||  || — || November 24, 2000 || Anderson Mesa || LONEOS || — || align=right | 4.5 km || 
|-id=934 bgcolor=#E9E9E9
| 93934 ||  || — || November 24, 2000 || Anderson Mesa || LONEOS || — || align=right | 2.4 km || 
|-id=935 bgcolor=#E9E9E9
| 93935 ||  || — || November 25, 2000 || Socorro || LINEAR || MAR || align=right | 2.7 km || 
|-id=936 bgcolor=#E9E9E9
| 93936 ||  || — || November 24, 2000 || Anderson Mesa || LONEOS || — || align=right | 3.7 km || 
|-id=937 bgcolor=#d6d6d6
| 93937 ||  || — || November 24, 2000 || Anderson Mesa || LONEOS || CHA || align=right | 3.9 km || 
|-id=938 bgcolor=#E9E9E9
| 93938 ||  || — || November 24, 2000 || Kitt Peak || Spacewatch || XIZ || align=right | 2.4 km || 
|-id=939 bgcolor=#E9E9E9
| 93939 ||  || — || November 25, 2000 || Socorro || LINEAR || MAR || align=right | 2.8 km || 
|-id=940 bgcolor=#E9E9E9
| 93940 ||  || — || November 25, 2000 || Socorro || LINEAR || MAR || align=right | 2.8 km || 
|-id=941 bgcolor=#E9E9E9
| 93941 ||  || — || November 25, 2000 || Socorro || LINEAR || HNS || align=right | 3.2 km || 
|-id=942 bgcolor=#E9E9E9
| 93942 ||  || — || November 25, 2000 || Socorro || LINEAR || HNS || align=right | 3.5 km || 
|-id=943 bgcolor=#d6d6d6
| 93943 ||  || — || November 25, 2000 || Socorro || LINEAR || — || align=right | 9.8 km || 
|-id=944 bgcolor=#E9E9E9
| 93944 ||  || — || November 25, 2000 || Socorro || LINEAR || GAL || align=right | 2.9 km || 
|-id=945 bgcolor=#d6d6d6
| 93945 ||  || — || November 26, 2000 || Socorro || LINEAR || — || align=right | 5.6 km || 
|-id=946 bgcolor=#E9E9E9
| 93946 ||  || — || November 26, 2000 || Socorro || LINEAR || — || align=right | 1.8 km || 
|-id=947 bgcolor=#E9E9E9
| 93947 ||  || — || November 26, 2000 || Socorro || LINEAR || — || align=right | 4.2 km || 
|-id=948 bgcolor=#E9E9E9
| 93948 ||  || — || November 27, 2000 || Socorro || LINEAR || — || align=right | 4.8 km || 
|-id=949 bgcolor=#E9E9E9
| 93949 ||  || — || November 30, 2000 || Gnosca || S. Sposetti || — || align=right | 3.1 km || 
|-id=950 bgcolor=#E9E9E9
| 93950 ||  || — || November 25, 2000 || Socorro || LINEAR || HNS || align=right | 3.2 km || 
|-id=951 bgcolor=#E9E9E9
| 93951 ||  || — || November 26, 2000 || Socorro || LINEAR || — || align=right | 3.6 km || 
|-id=952 bgcolor=#E9E9E9
| 93952 ||  || — || November 30, 2000 || Anderson Mesa || LONEOS || MAR || align=right | 3.0 km || 
|-id=953 bgcolor=#E9E9E9
| 93953 ||  || — || November 25, 2000 || Socorro || LINEAR || — || align=right | 2.7 km || 
|-id=954 bgcolor=#E9E9E9
| 93954 ||  || — || November 20, 2000 || Anderson Mesa || LONEOS || HNS || align=right | 2.3 km || 
|-id=955 bgcolor=#d6d6d6
| 93955 ||  || — || November 30, 2000 || Anderson Mesa || LONEOS || EOSslow || align=right | 3.7 km || 
|-id=956 bgcolor=#E9E9E9
| 93956 ||  || — || November 30, 2000 || Anderson Mesa || LONEOS || — || align=right | 3.1 km || 
|-id=957 bgcolor=#d6d6d6
| 93957 ||  || — || November 27, 2000 || Socorro || LINEAR || — || align=right | 4.8 km || 
|-id=958 bgcolor=#E9E9E9
| 93958 ||  || — || November 16, 2000 || Anderson Mesa || LONEOS || — || align=right | 5.0 km || 
|-id=959 bgcolor=#fefefe
| 93959 ||  || — || November 16, 2000 || Anderson Mesa || LONEOS || — || align=right | 2.1 km || 
|-id=960 bgcolor=#E9E9E9
| 93960 ||  || — || November 19, 2000 || Anderson Mesa || LONEOS || — || align=right | 3.9 km || 
|-id=961 bgcolor=#E9E9E9
| 93961 ||  || — || November 19, 2000 || Anderson Mesa || LONEOS || — || align=right | 2.9 km || 
|-id=962 bgcolor=#E9E9E9
| 93962 ||  || — || November 19, 2000 || Anderson Mesa || LONEOS || — || align=right | 5.5 km || 
|-id=963 bgcolor=#E9E9E9
| 93963 || 2000 XE || — || December 1, 2000 || Farpoint || G. Hug || ADE || align=right | 4.8 km || 
|-id=964 bgcolor=#E9E9E9
| 93964 ||  || — || December 4, 2000 || Haleakala || NEAT || — || align=right | 4.2 km || 
|-id=965 bgcolor=#E9E9E9
| 93965 ||  || — || December 1, 2000 || Socorro || LINEAR || EUN || align=right | 3.8 km || 
|-id=966 bgcolor=#E9E9E9
| 93966 ||  || — || December 1, 2000 || Socorro || LINEAR || — || align=right | 2.9 km || 
|-id=967 bgcolor=#E9E9E9
| 93967 ||  || — || December 1, 2000 || Socorro || LINEAR || — || align=right | 3.3 km || 
|-id=968 bgcolor=#E9E9E9
| 93968 ||  || — || December 1, 2000 || Socorro || LINEAR || — || align=right | 4.4 km || 
|-id=969 bgcolor=#E9E9E9
| 93969 ||  || — || December 1, 2000 || Socorro || LINEAR || — || align=right | 4.5 km || 
|-id=970 bgcolor=#E9E9E9
| 93970 ||  || — || December 1, 2000 || Socorro || LINEAR || EUN || align=right | 2.9 km || 
|-id=971 bgcolor=#E9E9E9
| 93971 ||  || — || December 1, 2000 || Socorro || LINEAR || CLO || align=right | 5.0 km || 
|-id=972 bgcolor=#E9E9E9
| 93972 ||  || — || December 1, 2000 || Socorro || LINEAR || — || align=right | 2.4 km || 
|-id=973 bgcolor=#E9E9E9
| 93973 ||  || — || December 1, 2000 || Socorro || LINEAR || — || align=right | 8.1 km || 
|-id=974 bgcolor=#d6d6d6
| 93974 ||  || — || December 1, 2000 || Socorro || LINEAR || — || align=right | 7.4 km || 
|-id=975 bgcolor=#E9E9E9
| 93975 ||  || — || December 1, 2000 || Socorro || LINEAR || GEF || align=right | 4.8 km || 
|-id=976 bgcolor=#E9E9E9
| 93976 ||  || — || December 1, 2000 || Socorro || LINEAR || — || align=right | 6.4 km || 
|-id=977 bgcolor=#E9E9E9
| 93977 ||  || — || December 1, 2000 || Socorro || LINEAR || — || align=right | 2.5 km || 
|-id=978 bgcolor=#E9E9E9
| 93978 ||  || — || December 1, 2000 || Socorro || LINEAR || EUN || align=right | 3.8 km || 
|-id=979 bgcolor=#E9E9E9
| 93979 ||  || — || December 1, 2000 || Socorro || LINEAR || — || align=right | 2.4 km || 
|-id=980 bgcolor=#E9E9E9
| 93980 ||  || — || December 4, 2000 || Socorro || LINEAR || — || align=right | 3.6 km || 
|-id=981 bgcolor=#E9E9E9
| 93981 ||  || — || December 4, 2000 || Socorro || LINEAR || — || align=right | 3.4 km || 
|-id=982 bgcolor=#d6d6d6
| 93982 ||  || — || December 4, 2000 || Socorro || LINEAR || — || align=right | 8.9 km || 
|-id=983 bgcolor=#E9E9E9
| 93983 ||  || — || December 4, 2000 || Socorro || LINEAR || — || align=right | 4.6 km || 
|-id=984 bgcolor=#E9E9E9
| 93984 ||  || — || December 4, 2000 || Socorro || LINEAR || — || align=right | 3.7 km || 
|-id=985 bgcolor=#E9E9E9
| 93985 ||  || — || December 1, 2000 || Socorro || LINEAR || MAR || align=right | 3.0 km || 
|-id=986 bgcolor=#E9E9E9
| 93986 ||  || — || December 1, 2000 || Socorro || LINEAR || MAR || align=right | 2.3 km || 
|-id=987 bgcolor=#E9E9E9
| 93987 ||  || — || December 1, 2000 || Socorro || LINEAR || — || align=right | 3.9 km || 
|-id=988 bgcolor=#E9E9E9
| 93988 ||  || — || December 1, 2000 || Socorro || LINEAR || KAZ || align=right | 5.1 km || 
|-id=989 bgcolor=#d6d6d6
| 93989 ||  || — || December 1, 2000 || Socorro || LINEAR || — || align=right | 5.8 km || 
|-id=990 bgcolor=#E9E9E9
| 93990 ||  || — || December 1, 2000 || Socorro || LINEAR || EUN || align=right | 3.8 km || 
|-id=991 bgcolor=#d6d6d6
| 93991 ||  || — || December 1, 2000 || Socorro || LINEAR || — || align=right | 8.1 km || 
|-id=992 bgcolor=#E9E9E9
| 93992 ||  || — || December 1, 2000 || Socorro || LINEAR || — || align=right | 3.2 km || 
|-id=993 bgcolor=#E9E9E9
| 93993 ||  || — || December 4, 2000 || Socorro || LINEAR || — || align=right | 4.5 km || 
|-id=994 bgcolor=#E9E9E9
| 93994 ||  || — || December 4, 2000 || Socorro || LINEAR || — || align=right | 2.9 km || 
|-id=995 bgcolor=#E9E9E9
| 93995 ||  || — || December 4, 2000 || Socorro || LINEAR || — || align=right | 2.9 km || 
|-id=996 bgcolor=#E9E9E9
| 93996 ||  || — || December 4, 2000 || Socorro || LINEAR || — || align=right | 7.9 km || 
|-id=997 bgcolor=#E9E9E9
| 93997 ||  || — || December 4, 2000 || Socorro || LINEAR || — || align=right | 3.1 km || 
|-id=998 bgcolor=#d6d6d6
| 93998 ||  || — || December 4, 2000 || Socorro || LINEAR || — || align=right | 7.7 km || 
|-id=999 bgcolor=#E9E9E9
| 93999 ||  || — || December 4, 2000 || Socorro || LINEAR || — || align=right | 2.6 km || 
|-id=000 bgcolor=#E9E9E9
| 94000 ||  || — || December 4, 2000 || Socorro || LINEAR || MAR || align=right | 3.3 km || 
|}

References

External links 
 Discovery Circumstances: Numbered Minor Planets (90001)–(95000) (IAU Minor Planet Center)

0093